= Berislav Grgić =

Bosnian Croat Catholic bishop

Monsignor Berislav Grgić
- Prelate Emeritus of Tromsø
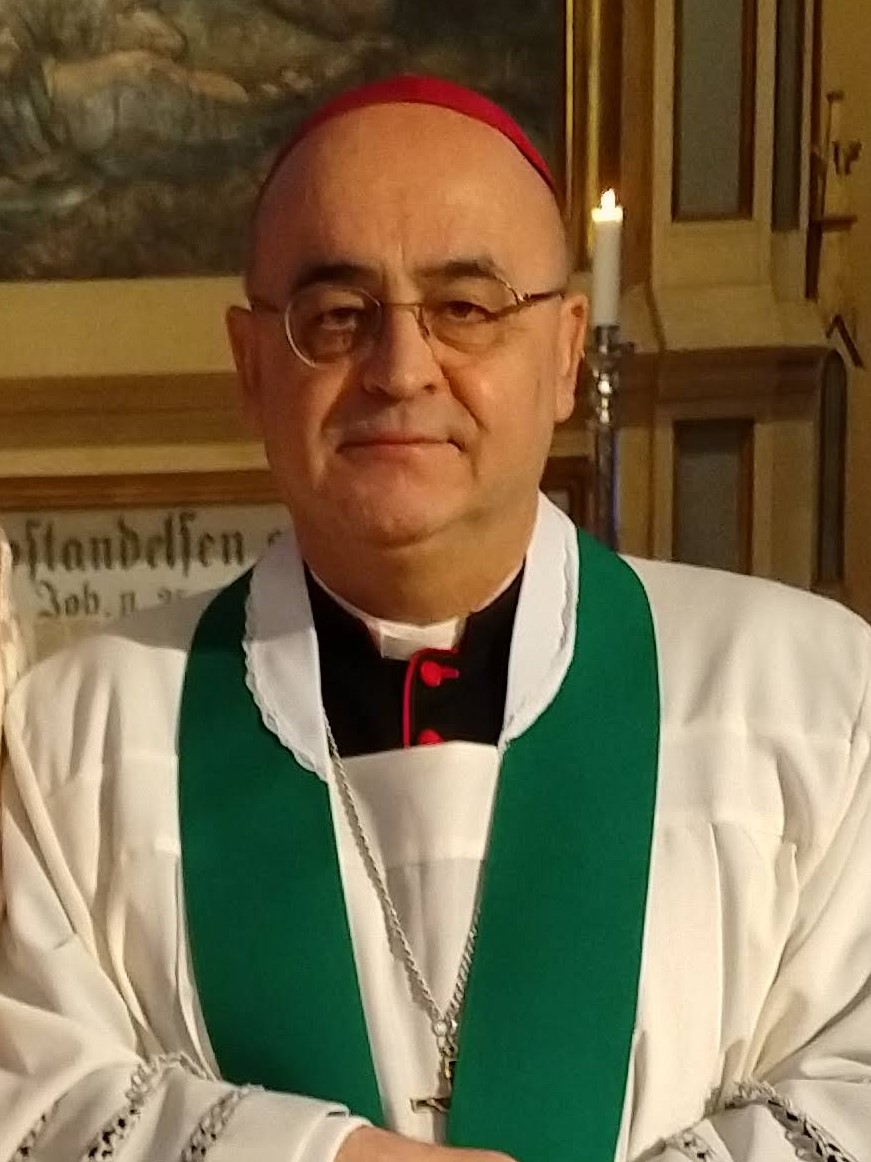
- Church: Catholic Church
- Diocese: Roman Catholic Territorial Prelature of Tromsø
- Appointed: 18 December 2008
- Predecessor: Gerhard Goebel

Orders
- Ordination: 29 June 1986 by Franjo Komarica
- Consecration: 28 March 2009 by Bernt Ivar Eidsvig

Personal details
- Born: 15 February 1960 (age 66) Kotor Varoš, Bosnia and Herzegovina, Yugoslavia
- Education: Pontifical Gregorian University
- Motto: Astare coram te
- Coat of arms

Berislav Grgić (Croatian: [běrislav ɡr̂ɡitɕ]; born 15 February 1960) is a Bosnian Croat bishop who served between 2008 and 2023 in Norway as the Roman Catholic Territorial Prelate of Tromsø, the northernmost Catholic bishopric in the world. Grgić fled Bosnia and Herzegovina during the Bosnian War, arriving in Norway as a refugee and eventually becoming one of the highest-ranking officials of the Catholic Church in Norway.

== Early life ==
Grgić was born into a Bosnian Croat family in Novo Selo, Kotor Varoš in Bosnia and Herzegovina, then a constituent republic of Yugoslavia. He was ordained as a priest by Bishop Franjo Komarica in Banja Luka on 29 June 1986. Starting his career in his native Roman Catholic Diocese of Banja Luka, he served as chaplain in Stara Rijeka until 1987 and then as vicar in Glamoč from 1987 to 1988. From then until 1991, he attended the Pontifical Gregorian University in Rome.

When the Yugoslav Wars between Catholic Croats and Orthodox Serbs erupted in 1991, Grgić was teaching at a seminary in Zadar, Croatia. He worked for Banja Luka Caritas, with headquarters in Zagreb, Croatia, during the Bosnian War from 1992 until April 1995. Grgić became a war refugee in August 1995 when Bosnian Serb authorities which controlled Banja Luka drove him out along with his parishioners. He went to Croatia and from there to Norway in January 1996. The Croatian Bishops' Conference, with the approval of the Bishops' Conference of Bosnia and Herzegovina, immediately named him pastor for 1200 Croat refugees within the Roman Catholic Diocese of Oslo. As such, Grgić taught catechism and celebrated mass in Serbo-Croatian. After learning Norwegian, he was entrusted with pastoral care of all immigrants in the diocese.

== Career in Norway ==
Grgić worked at St Sunniva School and as chaplain at St. Olav's Cathedral, Oslo, from 2000 and 2001 respectively before leaving Norway shortly for the Roman Catholic Archdiocese of Munich and Freising in 2007. He was appointed prelate of Tromsø on 18 December 2008 and consecrated as bishop by Bernt Ivar Eidsvig on 28 March the following year. The consecration took place in a special booth in the Protestant Tromsø Cathedral because the Catholic one was too small. It was attended by the Ambassador of Bosnia and Herzegovina to Norway Elma Kovačević, and by Croats from all of Norway.

Grgić is the first non-German Bishop of Tromsø. Though his bishopric is as large as the entire Bosnia and Herzegovina, it is very sparsely populated, so he spends most of his time traveling by airplane. A majority of 5,505 Catholics in his bishopric are not Norwegians, but only four are Bosnian Croats. In addition to his mother tongue, Grgić speaks Italian, German, English, and Norwegian. His resignation for health reasons was accepted by Pope Francis on 31 August 2023.

Catholic Church titles
Preceded by Gerhard Goebel	Prelate of Tromsø; 2008–2023	Incumbent
