= Christianity in Norway =

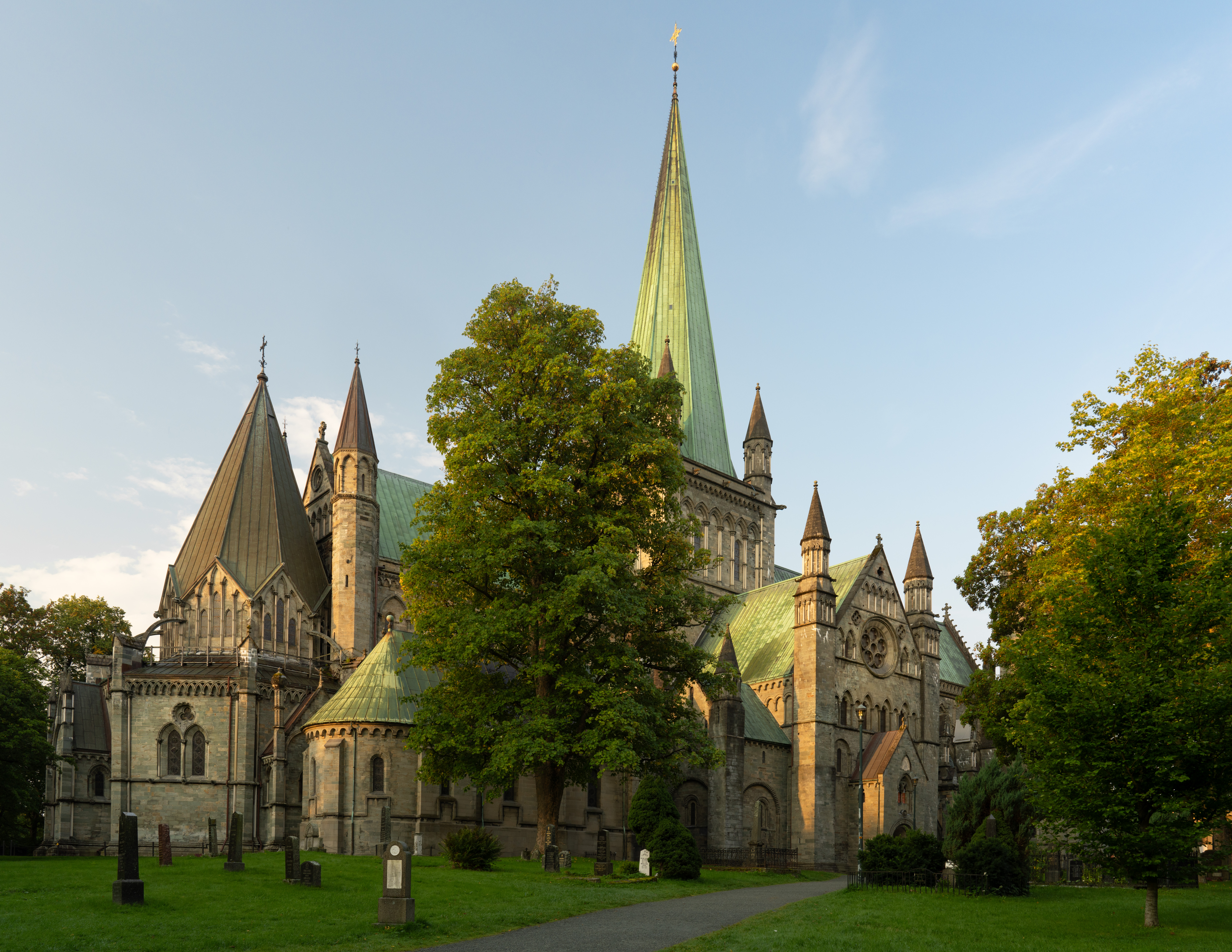
Nidaros Cathedral in Trondheim, Norway.

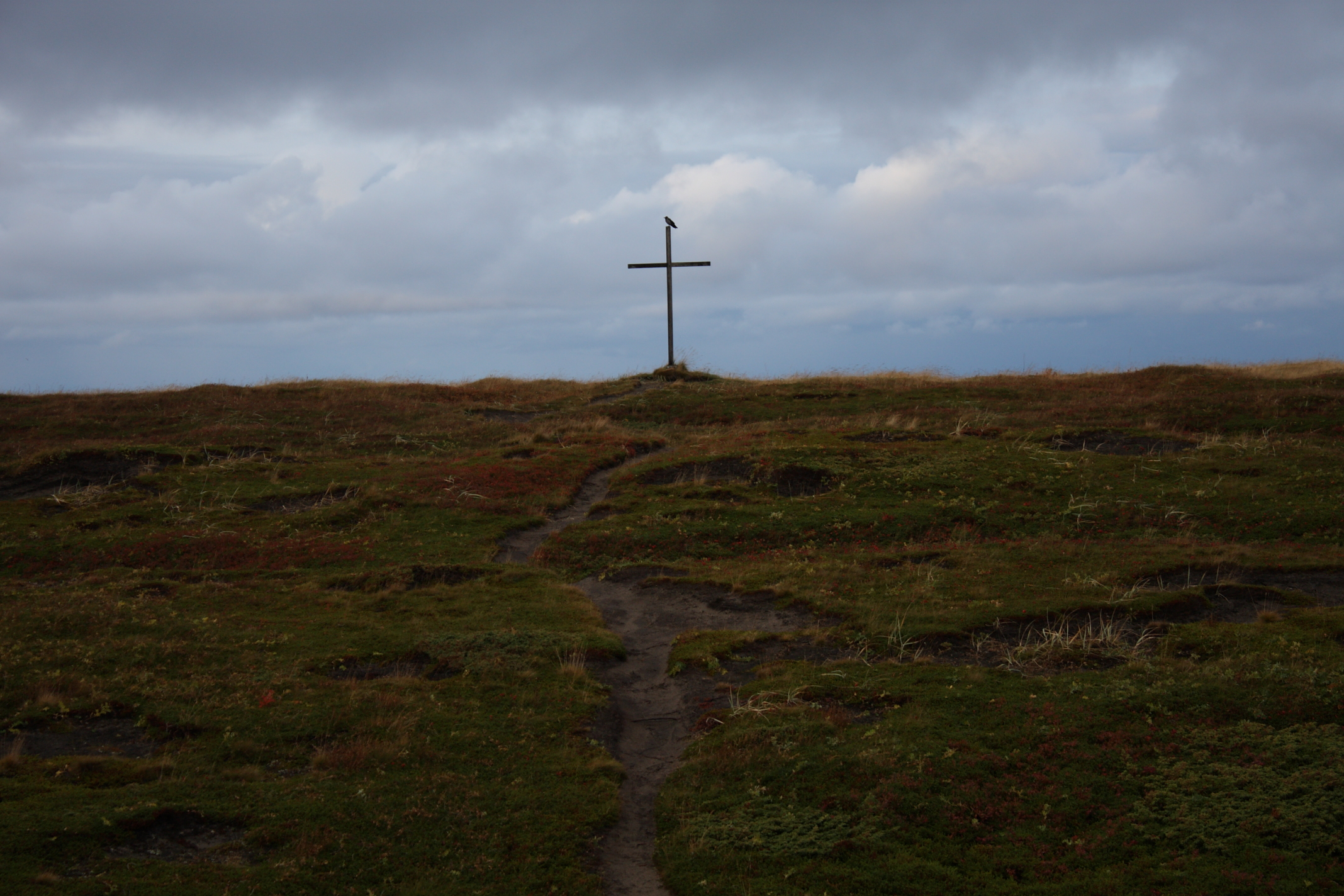
The conversion of Norway to Christianity began in 1000 AD. Prior to the conversion Norwegians practised Norse paganism.

Christianity is the largest religion in Norway and it has historically been called a Christian country. A majority of the population are members of the Church of Norway with 64.9% of the population officially belonging to the Evangelical Lutheran Church of Norway in 2021. At numerous times in history, Norway sent more missionaries per capita than any other country. This changed considerably from the 1960s. In 2004, only 12% of the population attended church services each month. The Church of Norway receives a fixed sum from the Government not based on membership numbers. Other religious organisations receive approximately the same amount per member.

In 1993, there were 4,981 churches and chapels in Norway.

== Christianization ==
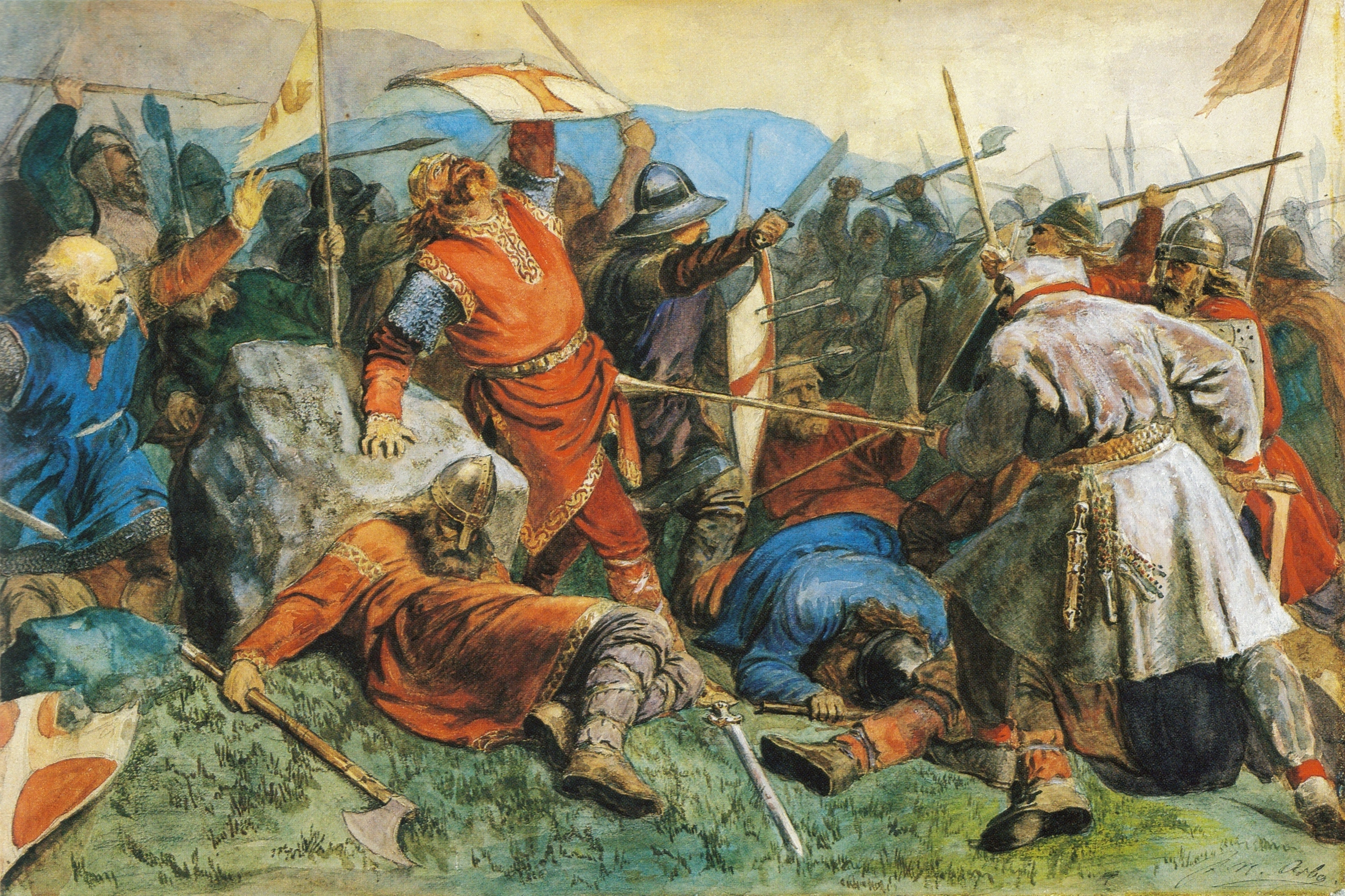
From the Battle of Stiklestad.

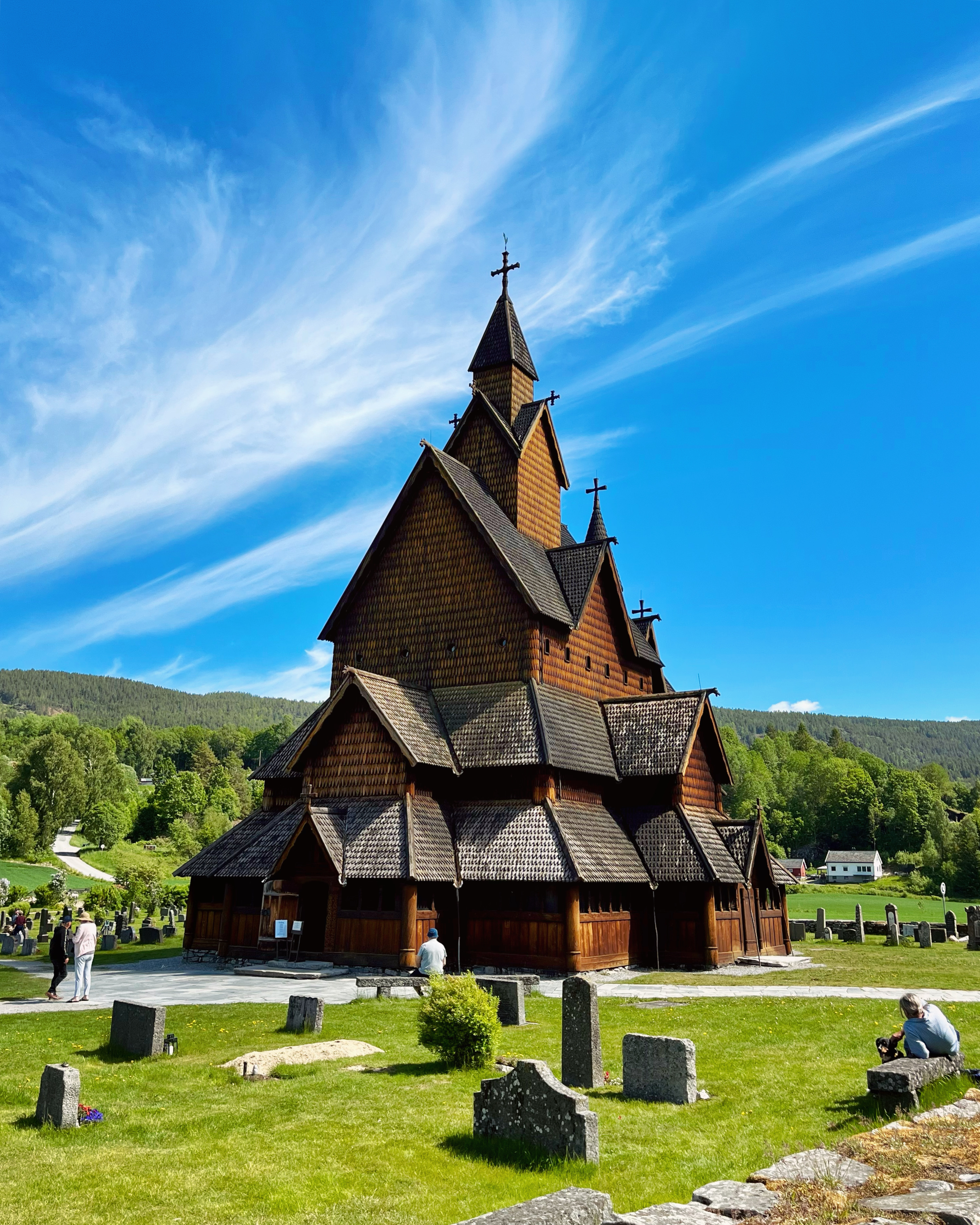
Heddal Stave Church from early 13th century.

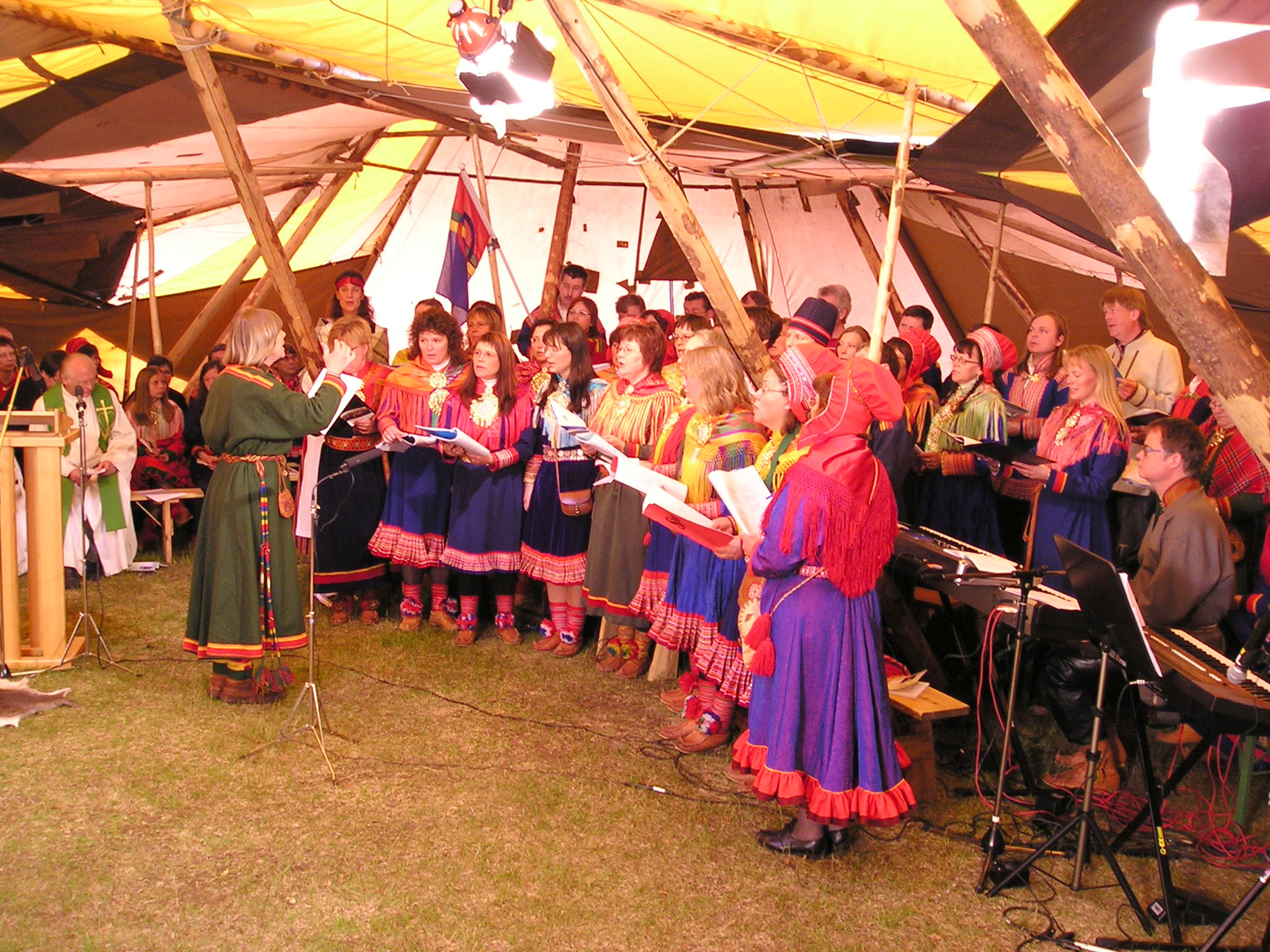
Shamanism persisted among the Sami up until the 18th century, but no longer exists in its traditional form. Most Sami today belong to the Lutheran church of Norway.

The conversion of Norway to Christianity began well before 1000 AD. The raids on Ireland, Britain and the Frankish kingdoms had brought the Vikings in touch with Christianity. Haakon the Good of Norway who had grown up in England tried to introduce Christianity in the tenth century, but had met resistance from pagan leaders and soon abandoned the idea.

Anglo-Saxon missionaries from England and Germany engaged in converting Norwegians to Christianity, but with limited success. However, they succeeded in converting Olaf I of Norway to Christianity. Olaf II of Norway (later Saint Olaf) had more success in his efforts to convert the population, and he is credited with Christianising Norway.

The Christians in Norway often established churches or other holy sites at places that had previously been sacred under the Norse religion. The spread of conversion can be measured by burial sites as Pagans were buried with grave goods while Christians were not. Christianity had become well established in Norway by the middle of the 11th century and had become dominant by the middle of the 12th century. Stave churches were built of wood without the use of nails in the 13th century.

== By county ==
County	Christians
Sogn og Fjordane	90.4%
Møre og Romsdal	90.2%
Nordland	89.9%
Oppland	89.6%
Finnmark	89.2%
Hedmark	89.1%
Trøndelag	88.9%
Troms	88.8%
Aust-Agder	87.5%
Telemark	86.6%
Vest-Agder	85.6%
Rogaland	85.4%
Vestfold	84.8%
Østfold	84.6%
Norway	84.2%
Buskerud	83.0%
Akershus	81.4%
Oslo	65.8%

The above numbers reflect the percentage of the population that are members of a church, typically from being baptized as infants. According to study collected on a sample of 706 Less than half of these define themselves as Christian.

== Compared with other countries and states ==
=== Church attendance ===
As of the early 21st century, Norway has one of the lowest church attendance rates in the world. Below is a table that compares Norway with other governmental divisions in regular church attendance for the early 21st century (2004–2006). In contrast to 250,000 regular churchgoers in the whole of Norway in 2004, 43,500 attend Lakewood Church in the United States each week, and 23,000 attend Hillsong Church in Australia each week.

The U.S. state of Alabama has a population roughly equal to that of Norway, but church attendance in Alabama is as much as 11 times higher than in Norway.

Country / State	Regular church attendance (%)	Regular church attendance (number)
Alabama	58%	2,700,000
Poland	56.7%	21,600,000
Texas	49%	12,140,000
United States average	42%	120,000,000
California	32%	11,830,000
Canada	25%	7,800,000
Vermont	24%	140,000
France	15%	9,800,000
United Kingdom	10%	6,000,000
Australia	7.5%	1,500,000
Norway	5%	250,000

== Public opinion ==
=== World Values Survey ===
Religious Affiliation/Identification	1982	1990	1996	2005
Percent belonging to a religious denomination	95.9%	90.2%	90.7%	–
Percent identifying as a religious person	48%	47.5%	46.9%	41.3%
Percent raised religious	–	45.7%	41.4%	–

Religious Behaviors	1982	1990	1996	2005
Percent attending religious services at least once a month	15.4%	12.7%	12.5%	10.8%
Percent that meditate or pray	61.6%	64.4%	–	33.2%
Percent active in a church or religious organization	–	–	8.3%	8.3%

Religious Beliefs	1982	1990	1996	2005
Percent believing in God	75.5%	65%	68.8%	–
Percent believing in heaven	51.9%	43.8%	46.7%	–
Percent believing in hell	23.5%	19.2%	19.7%	–
Percent believing in life after death	50.7%	44.7%	47.3%	–
Percent believing that there are clear guidelines on good and evil	31.4%	31.6%	29.1%	–
Percent believing that politicians who do not believe in God are unfit for public office	–	–	–	3.8%
Percent believing that religious leaders should not influence people's vote	–	–	–	8.9%
Percent believing that things would be better if there are more people with strong religious beliefs	–	–	–	6.2%
Percent believing church gives answers to people's spiritual needs	64.3%	55%	–	48.2%
Percent believing church gives answers on family life problems	36.5%	29.1%	–	16.1%
Percent believing churches give answers to moral problems	47.5%	40.9%	–	28.7%
Percent believing churches give answers to social problems	–	18.5%	–	11.7%
Percent believing that religious leaders should influence the government	–	–	–	79.4%
Percent believing that people have a soul	59%	54.4%	59.6%	–
Percent believing in the concept of sin	59.2%	44.2%	45.4%	–
Percent believing religious services are important for deaths	–	81.1%	–	–
Percent believing religious services are important for births	–	66.3%	–	–
Percent believing religious services are important for marriages	–	70.4%	–	–
Percent believing in a personal God	39.2%	29.8%	–	–
Percent believing in re-incarnation	38.4%	15.2%	–	–
Percent believing in the devil's existence	30.2%	24%	28%	–
Percent that think that religious faith is an important quality in children	–	–	–	8.6%
Percent that agree: We depend too much on science and not enough on faith	–	–	–	25.8%
Percent that do not trust people of other religions	–	–	–	20.4%
Percent that often think about meaning and purpose of life	–	–	–	20.2%

Religious Experiences	1982	1990	1996	2005
Percent finding comfort and strength from religion	48.5%	35.6%	39.5%	–

Attitudes	1982	1990	1996	2005
Percent considering religion important	–	40.3%	38.2%	32.8%
Percent considering that God is not at all important in their life	19.6%	24.8%	22.1%	27.9%
Percent confident in religious organizations	49.6%	44.6%	53.5%	50.5%

=== Other ===
Born again Christian	1997	2010
Percent who report Born-again Christian	19%	26%
People who report Born-again Christian	835,000	1,263,000

== Denominations ==
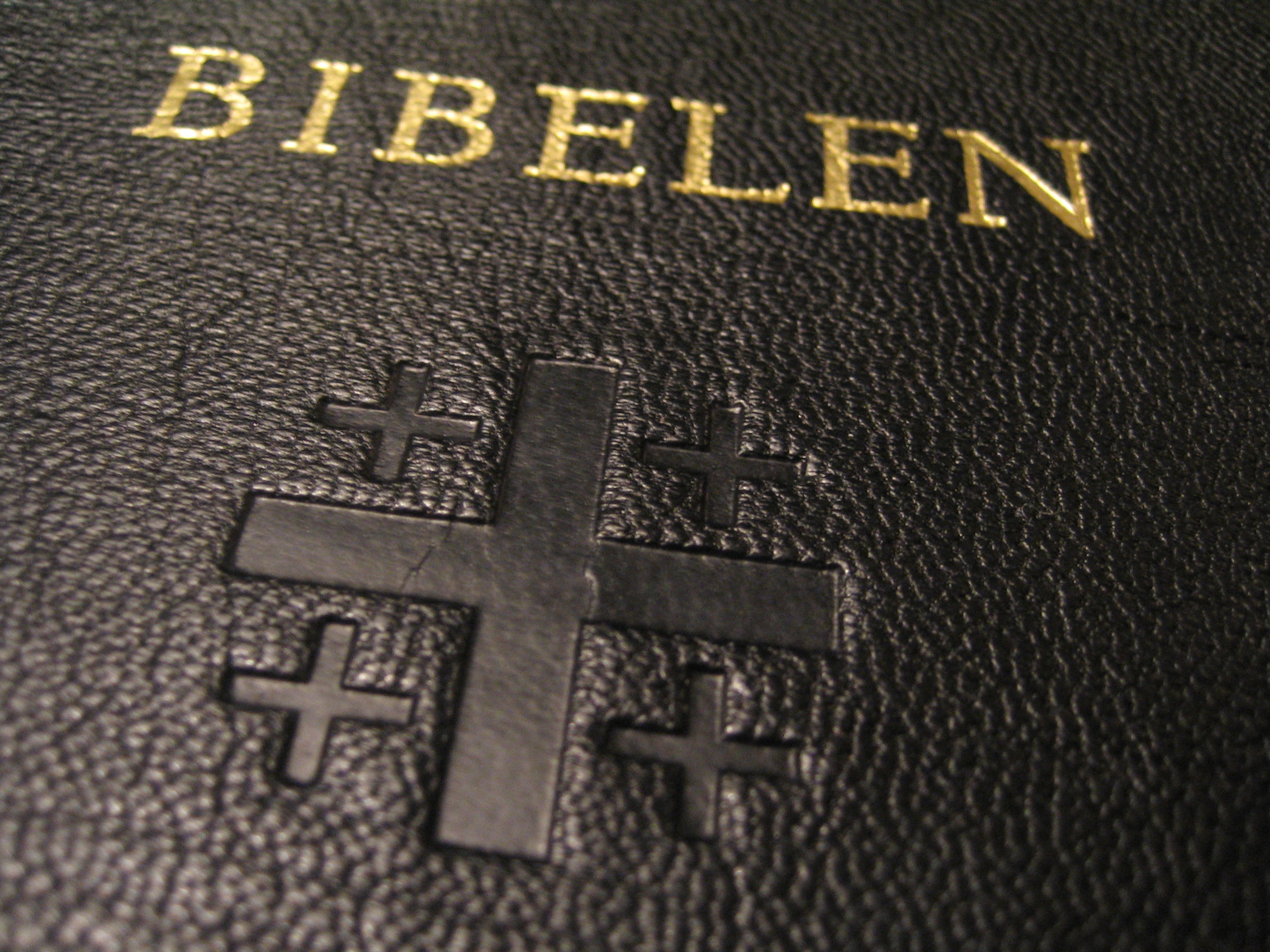
The Norwegian Bible, Bibelen.

=== Statistics Norway ===
Religion (on 31 December 2019)	Members	Percent	Growth (2014–2019)
Christianity	4,059,366	75.63%	-2.0%
Church of Norway	3,686,715	68.68%	−4.1%
Catholic Church	165,254	3.08%	72.8%
Pentecostal congregations	40,725	0.76%	4.0%
Eastern Orthodoxy and Oriental Orthodoxy	28,544	0.53%	63.3%
Evangelical Lutheran Free Church	19,313	0.36%	−1.0%
Jehovah's Witnesses	12,661	0.24%	2.9%
Baptists	10,823	0.20%	5.1%
The Methodist Church in Norway	10,000	0.19%	−5.4%
Other Christianity	85,331	1.59%	−6.8%
Total	5,367,850	100.0%	3.9%

=== The Association of Religion Data Archives ===
Denomination	Percent
Christian	92.0%
Agnostic	3.5%
Muslim	2.8%
Buddhist	0.7%
Atheist	0.6%
Baháʼí	0.1%
Neo-pagan	0.1%

=== Operation World 2001 ===
Denomination	Percent
Christianity	93.7%
Protestant	89.4%
Other Christian	2.0%
Independent	1.2%
Catholic	0.8%
Non-religious	5.0%
Islam	1.0%
Buddhism	0.2%

=== Protestantism ===
==== Church of Norway ====
The Church of Norway (Den norske kirke in Bokmål or Den norske kyrkja in Nynorsk) is the state church of Norway. The church confesses the Lutheran Christian faith. It has as its foundation the Christian Bible, the Apostles' Creed, Nicene Creed, Athanasian Creed, Luther's Small Catechism and the Augsburg Confession. The Church is a member of the Porvoo Communion with 12 other churches, among them the Anglican Churches of Europe. It has also signed some other ecumenical texts, including the Joint Declaration on the Doctrine of Justification with the Catholic Church and the Joint statement on the occasion of the Joint Catholic-Lutheran Commemoration of the Reformation in the city of Lund, Sweden in 2016.

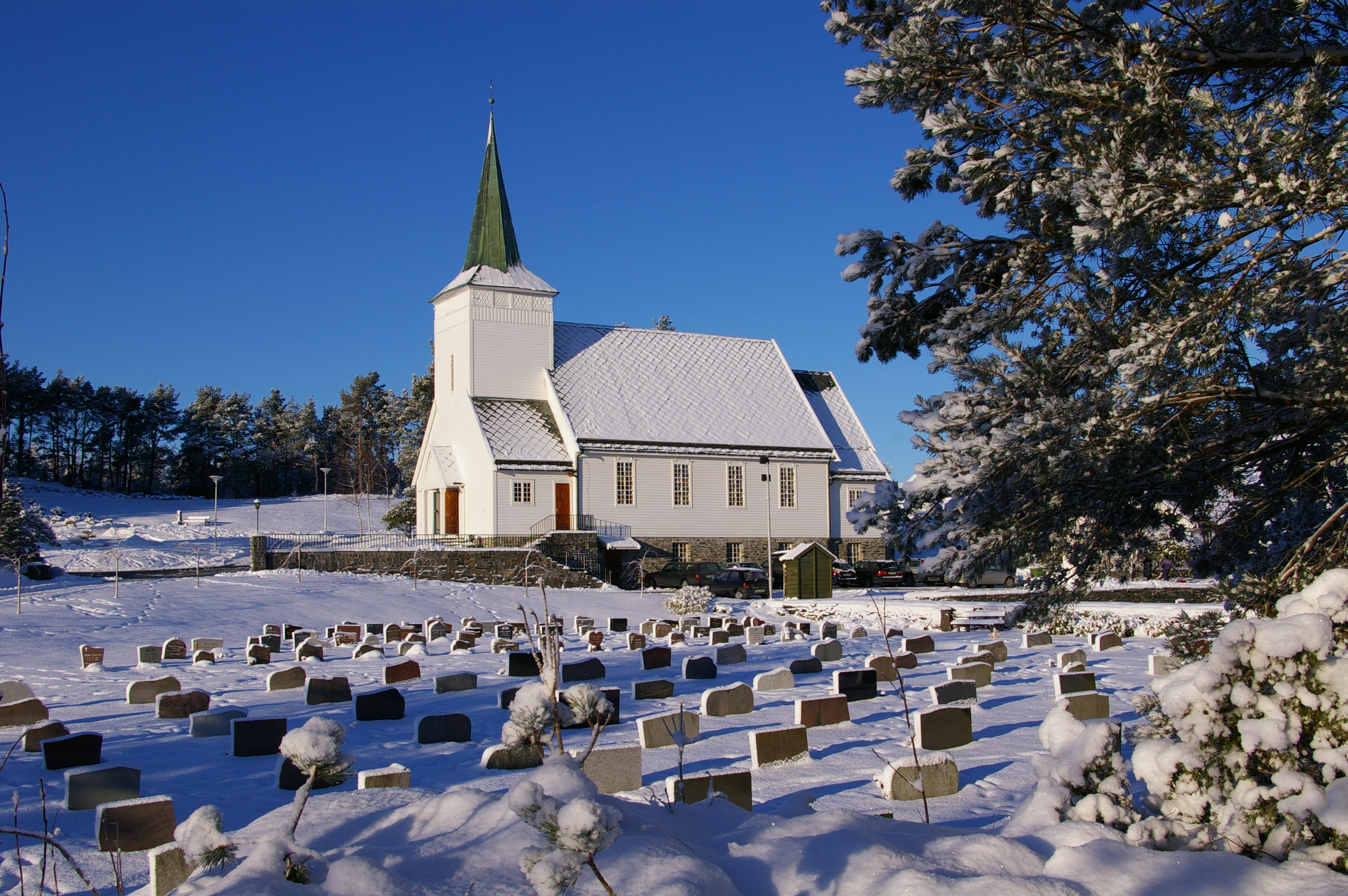
Most Norwegian villages have their own church like this.

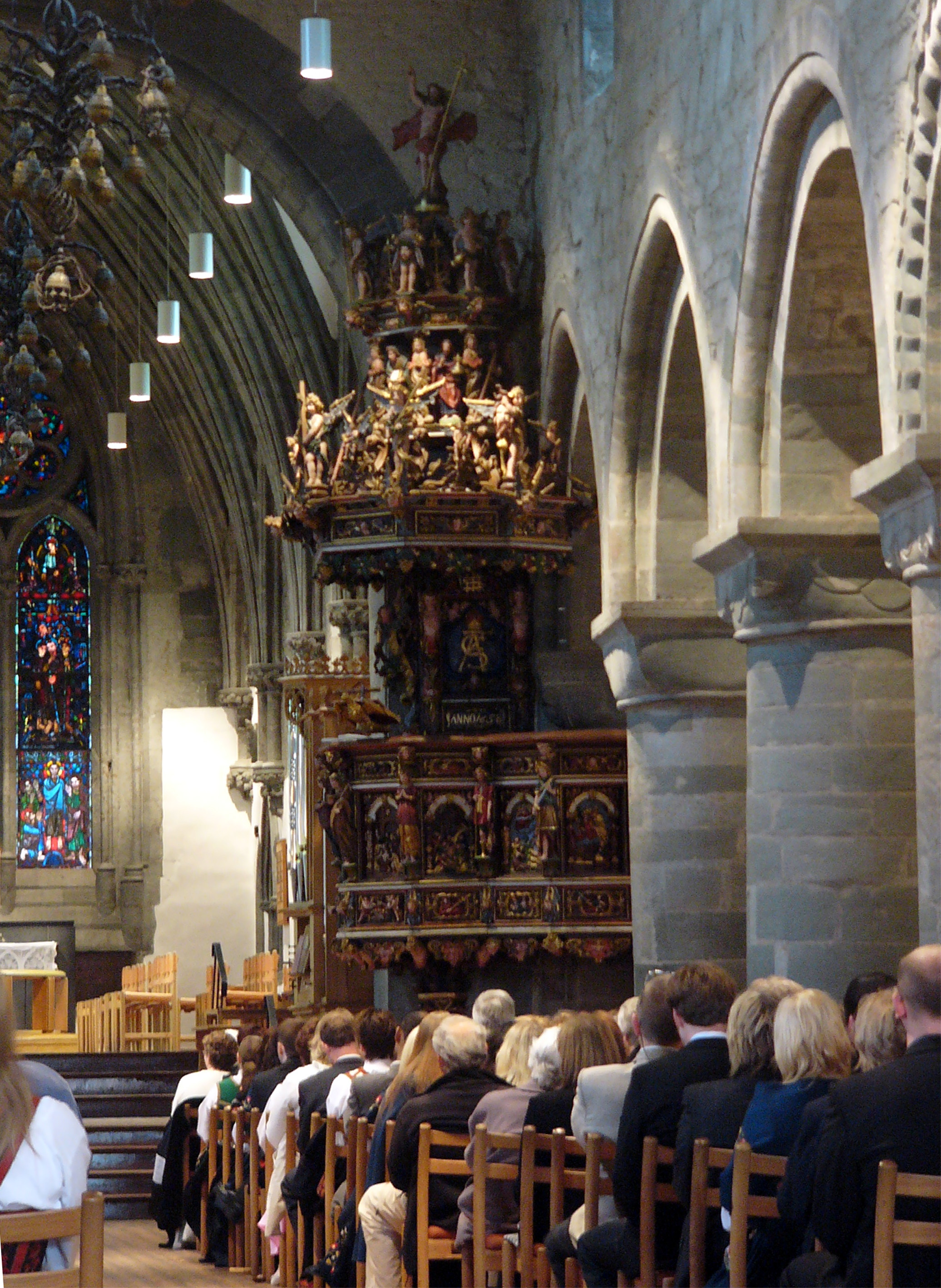
A service in Stavanger Cathedral.

The constitutional head of the Church is the King of Norway, who is obliged to profess the Lutheran faith. The Church of Norway is subject to legislation, including its budgets, passed by the Norwegian parliament, the Storting, and its central administrative functions are carried out by the Royal Ministry of Culture and Church Affairs.

The Church has a congregational and episcopal structure, with 1,284 parishes, 106 deaneries and 11 dioceses, namely:

- Diocese of Oslo, seated in Oslo, also covers Asker Municipality and Bærum Municipality (Bishop Ole Christian Kvarme)
- Diocese of Borg, seated in Fredrikstad covering Akershus and Østfold counties (Bishop Helga Haugland Byfuglien)
- Diocese of Hamar, seated in Hamar covering Innlandet county (Bishop Solveig Fiske)
- Diocese of Tunsberg, seated in Tønsberg covering Buskerud and Vestfold counties (Bishop Jan Otto Myrseth)
- Diocese of Agder og Telemark, seated in Kristiansand covering Agder and Telemark counties (Bishop Olav Skjevesland)
- Diocese of Stavanger, seated in Stavanger covering Rogaland county (Bishop Erling Pettersen)
- Diocese of Bjørgvin, seated in Bergen covering Vestland county (Bishop Halvor Nordhaug)
- Diocese of Møre, seated in Molde covering Møre og Romsdal county (Bishop Ingeborg Midttømme)
- Diocese of Nidaros, seated in Trondheim, covering Trøndelag county (Bishop Tor Singsaas)
- Diocese of Sør-Hålogaland, seated in Bodø, covering Nordland county (Bishop Tor Berger Jørgensen)
- Diocese of Nord-Hålogaland, seated in Tromsø, covering Troms and Finnmark counties (Bishop Per Oskar Kjølaas)

	As of 2008	Percent
Members	3,874,823	81.8%
Participation in worship services, Sundays and holidays	5,069,341	
Baptism	42,599	
Confirmation	41,655	
Consecration	10,536	
Funeral	38,832	

The following membership numbers are from Statistics Norway's data from 2016 to 2020:

==== Evangelical Lutheran Free Church of Norway ====
The Evangelical Lutheran Free Church of Norway (Den Evangelisk Lutherske frikyrkja i Noreg in Norwegian) or the Free Church as it is commonly known, is a nationwide Lutheran free church in Norway consisting of 81 congregations with 19,313 members in 2020, up from 18,908 in 2016. It was founded in 1877 in Moss. It should not be confused with the Church of Norway, though both churches are members of the Lutheran World Federation. The Free Church is financially independent.

==== The Swedish Church in Norway ====
13,108 members in 2020, down from 21,689 in 2016.

==== Mission Covenant Church of Norway ====
11,223 members in 2020, up from 10,598 in 2016.

==== Brunstad Christian Church ====
(previously known as Den Kristelige Menighet, 'the Christian Church')

8,726 members in 2020, up from 8,177 in 2016.

==== The Finnish Evangelical Lutheran Congregation ====
2,180 members in 2020, down from 4,117 in 2016.

==== Free Evangelical Congregations ====
3,127 members in 2020, down from 3,318 in 2016.

==== Christian Centres ====
2,968 members in 2020, down from 3,001 in 2016.

==== The Evangelical Lutheran Church Community ====
3,139 members in 2020, down from 3,177 in 2016.

==== The Icelandic Evangelical Lutheran Congregation in Norway ====
6,008 members in 2020, down from 6,830 in 2016.

==== The Christian Community ====
2,428 members in 2020, down from 2,550 in 2016.

=== Other Protestant ===
==== Pentecostal Congregations ====
40,725 members in 2020, up from 39,431 in 2016.

==== The Norwegian Baptist Union ====
10,823 in 2020, up from 10,367 in 2016.

==== Adventists ====
4,642 in 2020, down from 4,778 in 2016.

==== The Methodist Church in Norway ====
10,000 in 2020, down from 10,531 in 2016.

=== Catholic Church ===
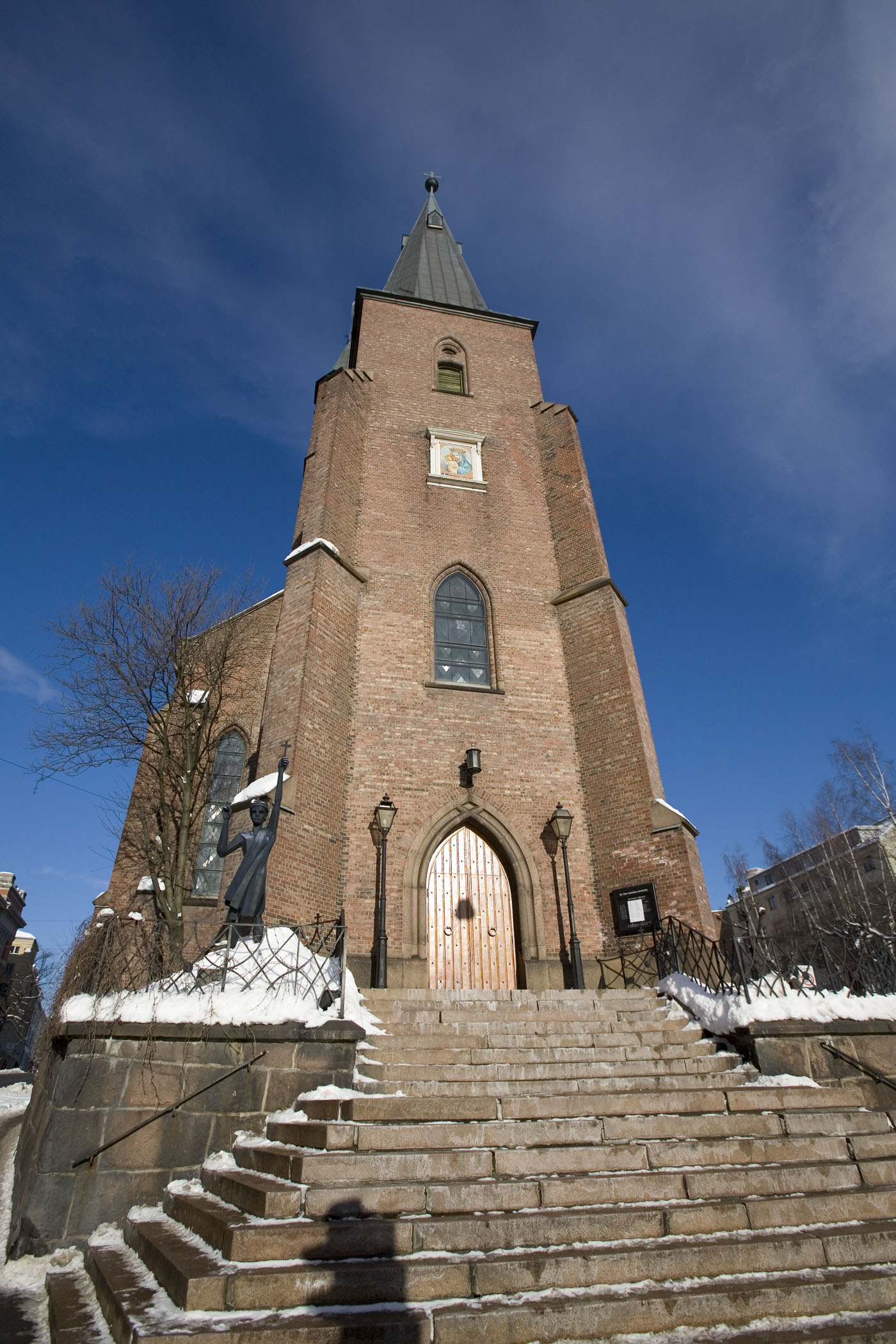
St. Olav Catholic Cathedral in Oslo.

The Catholic Church in Norway is part of the worldwide Catholic Church, under the spiritual leadership of the Pope and the Curia in Rome. Per 1 January 2020 the church had 165,254 registered members. The number has more than doubled since 2010 from approximately 67,000 members, mainly due to high immigration. There may be approximately 170,000–200,000 people of Catholic background in the country, most of them immigrants.

The country is divided into three Church districts – the Diocese of Oslo and the prelatures of Trondheim and Tromsø and 32 parishes. The Bishop of Oslo participates in the Scandinavian Bishops Conference. The Catholic Church in Norway is as old as the kingdom itself, dating from approximately 900 A.D., with the first Christian monarchs, Haakon I from 934.

At first, the bulk of Catholic immigrants came from Germany, the Netherlands, and France. Immigration from Chile, the Philippines, and from a wide range of other countries began in the 1970s. This development has further increased in the last few years with economic immigrants from Poland and Lithuania. Ethnic Norwegian Catholics are now greatly outnumbered by the immigrants, although the former tend to be far more observant and conservative, being a self-selected group largely of ex-Lutheran converts.

=== Orthodoxy ===
==== Eastern Orthodoxy ====
28,544 in 2020, up from 20,202 in 2016. The Orthodox Church has experienced a 235% increase in membership from 2010 to 2020.

=== Other Christian ===
==== Restorationism ====
===== Jehovah's Witnesses =====
Jehovah's Witnesses is the largest nontrinitarian religious organization in Norway, with a membership of 12,661 in 2020, up from 12,413 in 2016. A branch office is located in Ytre Enebakk. In 2022, the group lost its legal status as a religion over their exclusionary policies, although they are not banned within Norway. This legal status was restored by the Borgarting Court of Appeal in March 2025.

===== The Church of Jesus Christ of Latter-day Saints =====
The Church of Jesus Christ of Latter-day Saints (Norwegian: Jesu Kristi kirke av siste dagers hellige) is a restorationist free church. There are about 4,500 members in Norway, with history going back to 1851. There are 19 congregations, called wards and branches in Norway. A temple, to be built in Oslo, was announced on 4 April 2021 by church president Russell M. Nelson.

== See also ==
- Religion in Norway
