= Bernt Ivar Eidsvig =

Norwegian prelate (born 1953)

The Right Reverend Bernt Ivar Eidsvig C.R.S.A.
- Bishop of Oslo
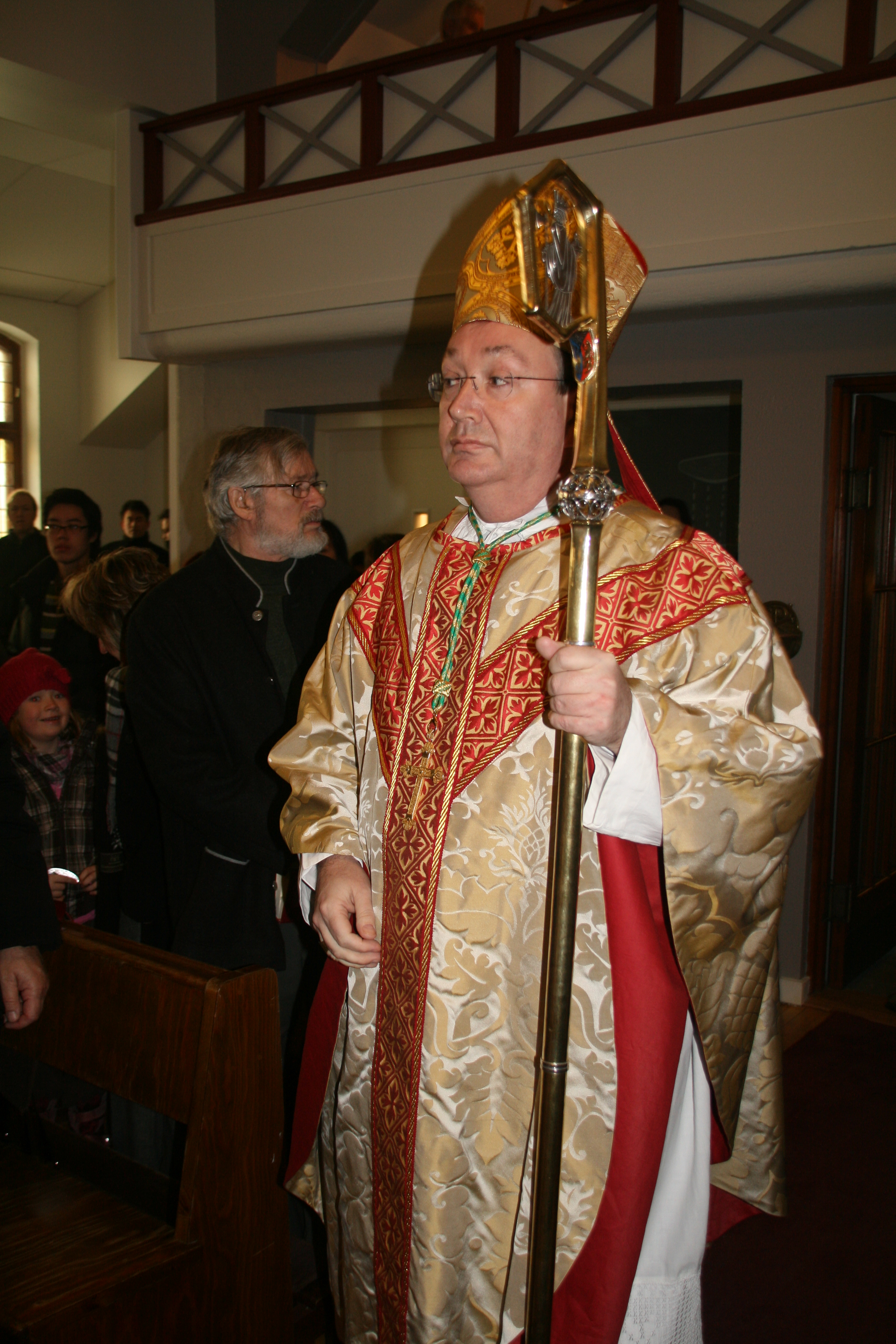
- Bernt Ivar Eidsvig in 2010
- Native name: Bernt Ivar Eidsvig
- Church: Roman Catholic
- Diocese: Roman Catholic Diocese of Oslo
- Installed: 22 October 2005
- Term ended: 16 July 2025
- Predecessor: Gerhard Schwenzer
- Successor: Fredrik Hansen
- Other post: Apostolic Administrator of Trondheim (2009–2019)

Orders
- Ordination: 20 June 1982 by John Willem Gran
- Consecration: 22 October 2005 by Gerhard Schwenzer

Personal details
- Born: 12 September 1953 (age 73) Rjukan, Norway
- Motto: Labori Non Honori
- Coat of arms: Bernt Ivar Eidsvig's coat of arms

Coat of arms of Bernt Ivar Eidsvig

Bernt Ivar Eidsvig, known 1991–2005 as Markus Bernt Eidsvig (born 12 September 1953), is a Norwegian prelate of the Catholic Church. He was the Bishop of Oslo from 2005 to 2025 and the Apostolic Administrator of the Roman Catholic Territorial Prelature of Trondheim from 2009 until 2019.

== Early life ==
Eidsvig was born and raised in Rjukan, Norway. He studied theology at the University of Oslo and planned to become a priest of the Norwegian Church. He took a theological degree at Oslo. He worked for ten years as a freelancer for the newspaper Morgenbladet. He converted to Catholicism on 20 December 1977.

== Arrest and imprisonment in Moscow ==
On 14 July 1976, Eidsvig was arrested by the KGB in Moscow while he was acting as a courier for the exiled Russian organization National Alliance of Russian Solidarists. His mission was to deliver leaflets, renal medicine, and a handbook of "rebellion" to a Soviet Russian in Moscow who had requested these supplies. The intended recipient had been betrayed and arrested. When he arrived to make the delivery he was arrested by agents of the KGB and was held in Lefortovo Prison for 101 days, when Norwegian Foreign Minister Knut Frydenlund and Prime Minister Trygve Bratteli negotiated his release.

== Clerical career ==
After completing licentiate studies at Heythrop College in London, Eidsvig was ordained as a priest of Oslo Catholic Diocese of St. Olav's Cathedral in Oslo on 20 June 1982 by John Willem Gran, Bishop of Oslo. He served for a time in the military chaplain corps of the Norwegian Armed Forces, partly at Evjemoen north of Kristiansand and partly with the medic recruits' company in Bømoen near Voss. He then served as chaplain at St. Paul's in Bergen and on 1 January 1986 became pastor there. He moved and expanded the Catholic school St. Paul Bergen. He was also a teacher at the school and active in the language association Riksmålsforbundet. In the Catholic Diocese of Oslo, he served on the Priests' Council from 1983 to 1990, the Consultors' Council from 1987 to 1990, and the Pastoral Council from 1988 to 1991.

In the summer of 1991, Eidsvig was received as a novice by the Canons of Stift Klosterneuburg in Austria, just outside Vienna. He was invested with the religious habit on 27 August 1991, and received the name Mark. He made his profession of vows on 30 August 1995. He then worked from 1997 to 2003 as pastor of St. Leopold's Church in Klosterneuburg, and from 1996 at the monastery as master of novices. Under his leadership of the novitiate, the Stift Klosterneuburg took on a more international flavor, welcoming candidates from the United States, Germany, Norway, and Vietnam, the last by way of Norway as refugees. He has also been chapter counselor and chapter secretary of the Stift.

== Bishop ==
Pope Benedict XVI appointed Eidsvig Bishop of Oslo on 11 July 2005. The announcement was delayed to the symbolic date of 29 July, the memorial day of Norway's patron saint, St. Olav. Eidsvig was the first Canon of Klosterneuburg to be appointed bishop since 1913, when the monastery Pastor Friedrich Gustav Piffl was appointed Archbishop of Vienna. On 22 October 2005, he received his episcopal consecration in the Lutheran Trinity Church, opened to the Catholic community by the Norwegian Church for the occasion, and then was installed in St. Olav Cathedral. The consecration mass was broadcast on the Internet (Web TV) via www.katolsk.no. Eidsvig is the third Norwegian-born Catholic bishop in Norway since the Reformation, after Olaf Offerdahl (consecrated in 1930 and died half a year later) and John Willem Gran (consecrated 1963, died 2008).

Eidsvig was named Apostolic Administrator of the Territorial Prelature of Trondheim on 8 June 2009, upon the resignation of Bishop Georg Müller, who had left office as the result of child sex abuse charges. His term as Apostolic Administrator ended on 3 October 2020 with the consecration of the new Bishop–Prelate of Trondheim.

On 16 July 2025, Pope Leo XIV accepted Eidsvig's resignation as the Bishop of Oslo, he was succeeded by the Coadjutor Bishop of Oslo, Fredrik Hansen.

=== Fraud charge ===
On 26 February 2015, Eidsvig and the financial manager of the Catholic Diocese of Oslo were charged with felony fraud, after the diocese was reported on suspicion of registering people as members of the Roman Catholic Church in Norway without their knowledge or consent. The charges against Eidsvig were dropped in November 2016 when the other parties were brought to trial.

== Coat of arms ==
Eidsvig coat of arms as a bishop is divided into four fields. 1. and 4 field (upper heraldic right and lower left quadrant), Oslo Catholic bishop arms (Olavsøksene, which are two axes, gold on red background), while the other two have half the arms of Klosterneuburg (T-cross upside down, silver on red background) combined with the flowering rod of Aaron (gold on blue background). Klosterneuburg arms are divided according to the rule that only the provost can use all the arms, while the bishops who belonged to the monastery use it half combined with another emblem. The shield is crowned with a green mitre, with six green tassels on each side of a bishop's cross. His motto is Labori non Honori, "work, not honor." Cardinal Piffl, Archbishop of Vienna, elected in 1913, used the same motto. Both prelates were canons of Klosterneuburg. It is a reproduction (not a verbatim quote) of a passage in St. Augustine's writings.

== Honours ==
Eidsvig was in 2014 made a Knight Commander with Star of the Order of the Holy Sepulchre. He is the Grand Prior of the Norwegian Lieutenancy of the Order.

== Bibliography ==
- 101 dager hos KGB (101 days with the KGB), Oslo 1977.
- Valfart til Lourdes: Et katolsk tilbud til soldater og befal (editor with Roar Haldorsen), Oslo: Unge norske katolikkers forbund, 1982

This is a brief publication mentioning the annual organized military pilgrimage to Lourdes (in France), and how interested (Norwegian) soldiers or officers may get to participate in it.

- "Den katolske kirke vender tilbake", in Den katolske kirke i Norge (editors: John W. Gran, Erik Gunnes, Lars Roar Langslet), Oslo 1993

This was a key contribution in a historical overview, published on the occasion of the 150-year anniversary of the Catholic Church's return to Norway in 1843.
