= Georg Müller (Catholic bishop) =

German Catholic bishop in Norway (1951–2015)

Georg Müller SS.CC.
- Prelate of Trondheim
- Church: Catholic Church
- See: Territorial Prelature of Trondheim
- In office: 20 June 1997 – 8 June 2009
- Predecessor: Gerhard Schwenzer
- Successor: Erik Varden
- Previous post: Apostolic Administrator of Trondheim (1988-1997)

Orders
- Ordination: 18 March 1978
- Consecration: 28 July 1997 by Edward Cassidy

Personal details
- Born: 7 June 1951 Volkesfeld, Rhineland-Palatinate, West Germany
- Died: 25 October 2015 (aged 64) Münster, North Rhine-Westphalia, Germany

Georg Müller, SS.CC. (7 June 1951 – 25 October 2015) was the Bishop of the Roman Catholic Territorial Prelature of Trondheim, which encompasses central sections of Norway, from 1988 to 1997.

== Biography ==
Müller was born in Volkesfeld, Germany. He completed his early education in Lahnstein am Rhein in 1971. He made his simple vows with the Congregation of the Sacred Hearts of Jesus and Mary, known as the Arnsteiner Fathers, on 28 July 1972, and completed his training at the order's theological seminary in 1977. He was ordained to the priesthood on 18 March 1978 in Simpelveld in the Netherlands by his predecessor in Trondheim Bishop Gerhard Schwenzer. He graduated from the University of Münster in 1981.

In 1981, he began his pastoral work in Trondheim as a parish priest, became vicar general in 1984, and a parish pastor in 1997. Pope John Paul II named him Apostolic Administrator of Trondheim on 9 February 1988 and then Prelate of Trondheim on 20 June 1997. He received his episcopal consecration there on 28 July 1997 from Cardinal Edward Cassidy. As the leader of the church in Trondheim, he was successful in recruiting sisters from several orders to work in Norway.

== Sexual abuse ==
Pope Benedict XVI accepted his resignation on 8 June 2009, when he was 58, citing the provision of Canon Law that a bishop can resign if unable to fulfil his office. The normal retirement age for a bishop is 75. Speculation in the media attributed his removal to internal problems within the local Church administration.

On 7 April 2010, the Norwegian daily newspaper Adresseavisen reported that Müller had resigned following allegations of sexual abuse 20 years earlier. The report was confirmed by Catholic Church officials in Norway, and a spokesperson for the Congregation for the Doctrine of the Faith confirmed that the abuse of a boy had been reported to Church officials in January 2009. It said Müller had undergone therapy and was no longer engaged in pastoral work. The accuser chose to remain anonymous, and due to the statute of limitations, no legal action could be pursued. Müller's removal came after Church officials had followed a review process that included a determination by a priest appointed by the Bishop of Stockholm that the charge was credible, a referral to the Vatican by Archbishop Emil Paul Tscherrig, the Apostolic Nuncio to Norway, and a final determination of guilt by a three-judge panel. A spokesperson for the Catholic Church in Norway said that in 2009, "The official explanation was that the bishop had problems cooperating with others in the church, but that was only a part of the truth. The reason for not coming out with everything was that the victim did not want that." Oslo Bishop Bernt Ivar Eidsvig said: "Müller has been divested of his authority, and he won't be allowed to work in a church again. He will never again be given a position in the church." The man who accused Müller thanked the Church for confirming his allegations and for the support it had provided him. Media coverage was extensive in Norway and included reports that Müller was celebrating Mass in public at a hospital in Germany. Bishop Eidsvig called that "improper and impermissible" and said he would pursue the matter. In Germany, officials at the hospital and the local diocese said they had not been informed of any charges against Müller. The Church reportedly later paid a settlement of over 400,000 krone.

In an interview with Byavisa, a local Trondheim newspaper, in August 2013, Müller denied there had been any abuse. He said that his departure from Trondheim was misinterpreted as an admission of guilt when he had only left to avoid the media. He stated that a German clinic in Osnabrück had confirmed that he was never a pedophile. Müller had sought without success to retract his statements before publication. The newspaper also reported that he appeared not to be supervised in any way, despite the Vatican's commitment that he would be. Bishop Eidsvig said Müller's statement showed bad judgment and that Müller had confessed in 2009. He doubted Müller would attempt to have the Vatican rehabilitate him.

In retirement, he lived at his order's residences, first in Rome and then in Münster. He died in Münster on 25 October 2015. The obituary published online by his order did not mention the reasons for his resignation. It said that "he bore his suffering with composure and patience".

Muller was not replaced in Trondheim until 2019. Bishop Eidsvig was named Apostolic Administrator when Muller's resignation was accepted in 2009, and he served until 2019 when Erik Varden was nominated as his successor.

== See also ==
- Catholic Church sex abuse cases
