= Zorzila =

Zorzila may refer to:

- Zorzila (Pisidia), a town of ancient Pisidia, now in Turkey
- Zorzila, Gorj, a village in the municipality of Ciuperceni, Gorj, Romania
