= Domkirke =

Domkirke means 'Cathedral' in Danish and Norwegian and may refer to:

- List of cathedrals in Norway
  - particularly Oslo Cathedral, Norway
- List of cathedrals in Denmark
  - particularly Roskilde Cathedral, Denmark

== Other uses ==
- Dømkirke, a 2008 album by Sunn O))) recorded at Bergen Cathedral
