= List of cathedrals in Norway =

This is the list of cathedrals in Norway sorted by denomination.

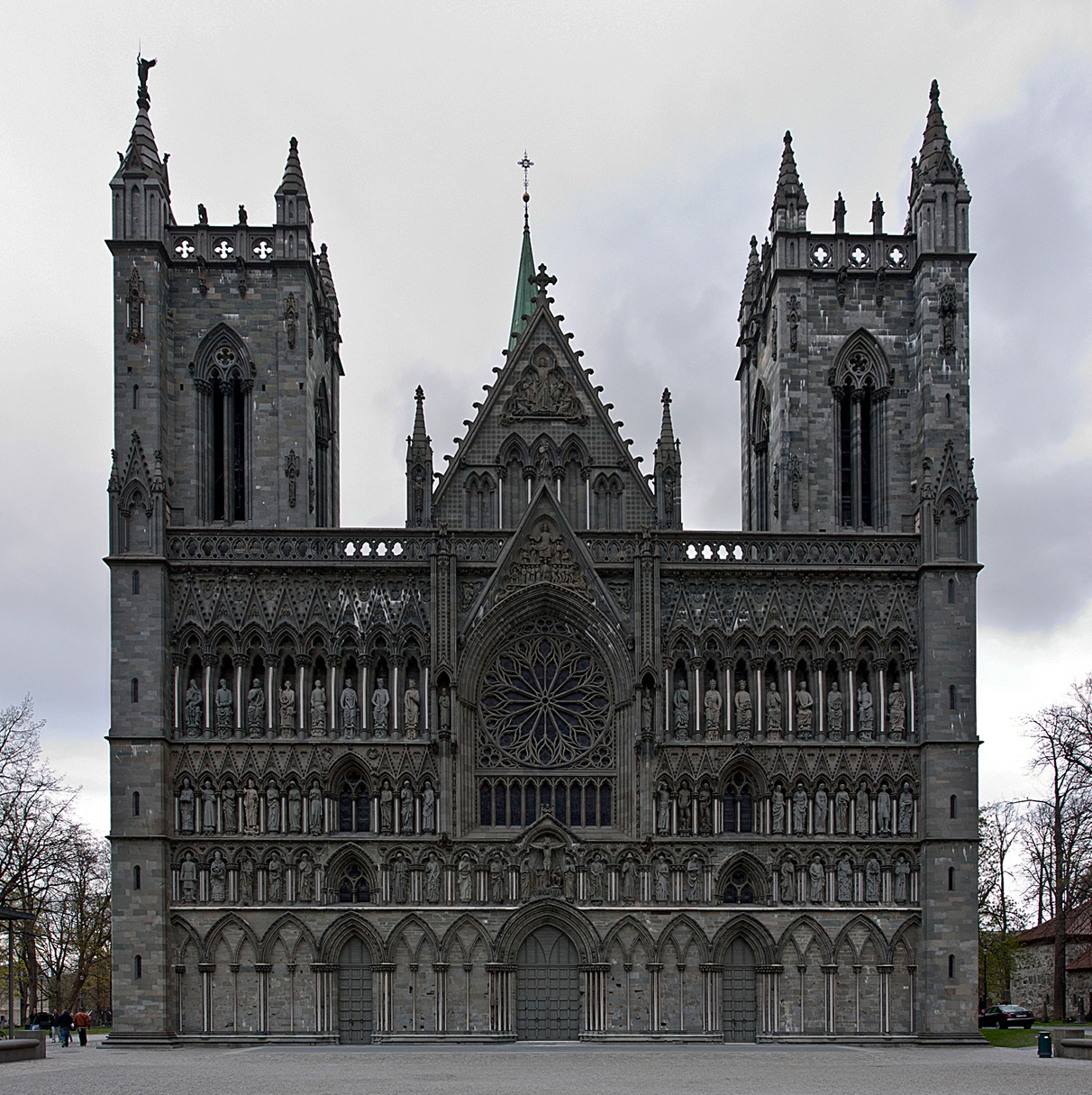
Nidaros Cathedral in Trondheim.

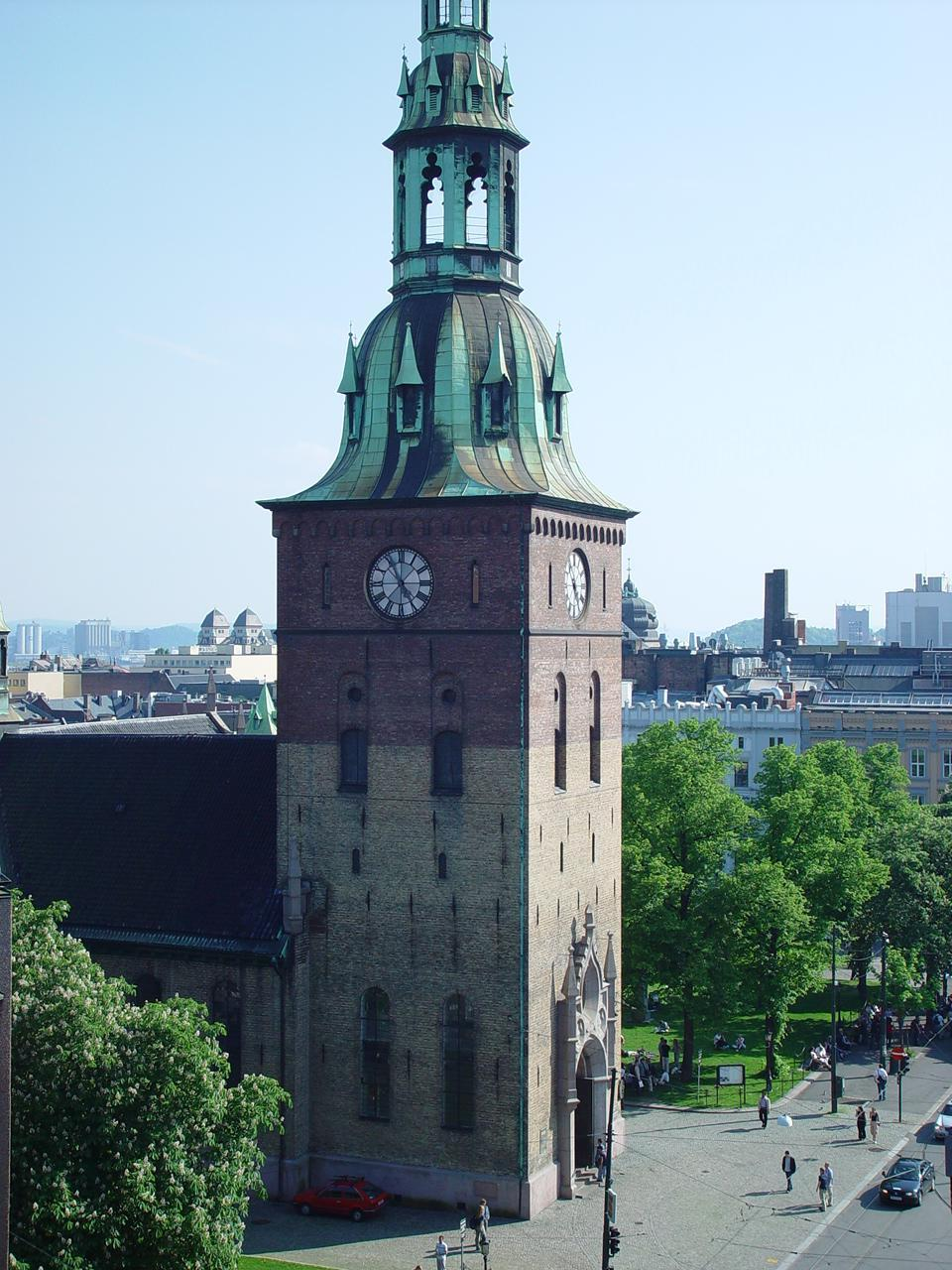
Oslo Cathedral.

== Lutheran ==
Cathedrals of the Church of Norway:

- Nidaros Cathedral in Trondheim
- Oslo Cathedral in Oslo
- Bergen Cathedral in Bergen
- Bodø Cathedral in Bodø
- Fredrikstad Cathedral in Fredrikstad
- Hamar Cathedral in Hamar
- Kristiansand Cathedral in Kristiansand
- Molde Cathedral in Molde
- Stavanger Cathedral in Stavanger
- Tønsberg Cathedral in Tønsberg
- Tromsø Cathedral in Tromsø

== Roman Catholic ==
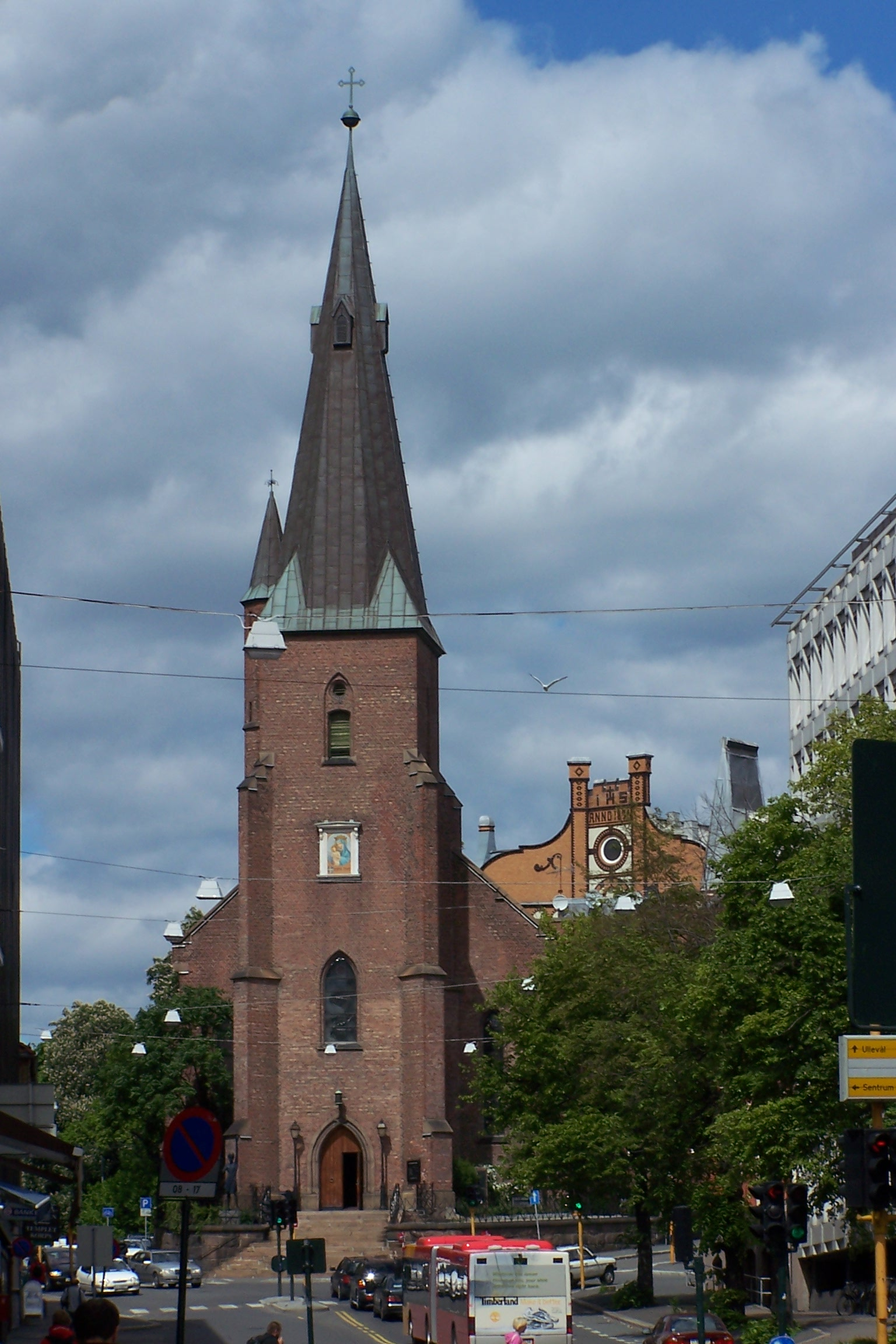
St. Olav's Cathedral, Oslo

Cathedrals of the Roman Catholic Church in Norway:

- St. Olav's Cathedral in Trondheim
- Pro-Cathedral of St. Olav in Oslo
- Cathedral of Our Lady in Tromsø

== Ruins and Demolished Cathedrals ==
Ruins and Demolished Cathedrals in Norway

- St. Hallvard's Cathedral in Oslo
- Holy Trinity Church in Oslo
- Christ Church in Bergen
- Cathedral Ruins in Hamar
- St. Olav's Cathedral (1973) in Trondheim

== See also ==
- List of cathedrals
- Christianity in Norway
