= Zarzela =

Ancient city in Pisidia

Zarela, also known as Durzela, Zorzila, Dyrzela, and Zorzela, was a city and bishopric in ancient Pisidia (part of Asia Minor, Asian Turkey), which remains a Latin Catholic titular see. It site is unlocated.

== History ==
Zarzela, identified as modern Kasimler, was a city in the Roman province of Pisidia 'civil Diocese of Asia and became a suffrage of its capital Antiochia in Pisidia's Metropolitan archbishopric, in the sway of the Patriarchate of Constantinople, which lists it in the Byzantine Notitiae Episcopatuum till late 12th century.

Several historically documented bishops were associated with the see.

- Lequien includes as incumbents Theodoros, participant in the ecumenical First Council of Nicaea in 325, actually bishop of Vasada in Lycaonia
  and Macedon, che participant in the Council of Constantinople in 381, actually bishop of Xanthus, Lycia in Lycia.
- Undoubted is only Maximinus, at the Council of Chalcedon on 25 October 451 represented by his Metropolitan Pergamius, who signed in his name the Chalcedonian Creed; Maximinus himself signed in 458 the letter of Pisidia's episcopate to Byzantine emperor Leo I the Thracian after the lynching by Coptic mobs of Patriarch Proterius of Alexandria.

== Titular see ==
The diocese was nominally restored in 1933 as Latin Episcopal (lowest rank) Titular bishopric of Zarzela (Latin =Curiate Italian) / Zarzelen(sis) (Latin adjective), but hasn't had a single incumbent yet.
