= Erik Varden =

Norwegian Catholic bishop and monk (born 1974)

The Most Reverend Erik Varden OCSO
- Bishop-Prelate of Territorial Prelature of Trondheim
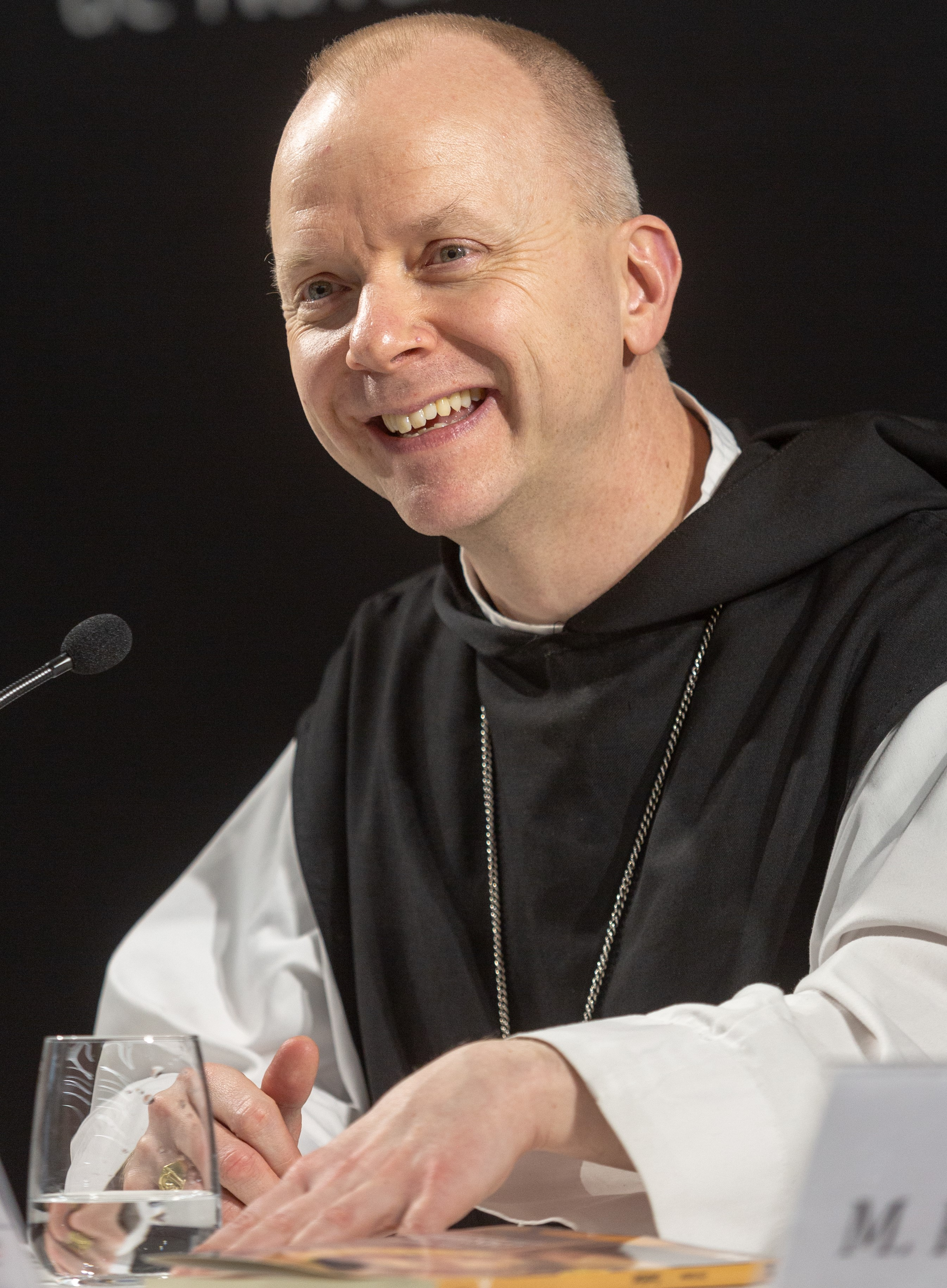
- Varden in 2024
- Church: Catholic
- Appointed: 1 October 2019
- Predecessor: Georg Müller
- Other post: Abbot of Mount St Bernard Abbey (2013–2019)

Orders
- Ordination: 16 July 2011 by Malcolm McMahon
- Consecration: 3 October 2020 in Nidaros Cathedral by Bernt Ivar Eidsvig

Personal details
- Born: 13 May 1974 (age 52) Sarpsborg, Norway
- Motto: Coram fratribus intellexi (Latin for 'Understanding with my brothers')
- Coat of arms

Erik Varden OCSO (born 13 May 1974) is a Norwegian Catholic prelate, writer, and Trappist monk who has served as Bishop of Trondheim since 2020.

== Early life and education ==
Varden was born in a non-practising Lutheran family in South Norway and grew up in the village of Degernes. After concluding his school education in Norway, he continued to study at the Atlantic College, Wales (until 1992) and then at Magdalene College, Cambridge (1992–1995) with Master of Arts degree in Theology and Religious Studies through the Faculty of Divinity. He obtained a doctorate through the same faculty as a member of St John's College, Cambridge, and subsequently a Licentiate of Sacred Theology at the Pontifical Oriental Institute in Rome. He officially entered the Catholic Church in June 1993.

In 2002, Varden was admitted to Mount St Bernard Abbey, a Trappist monastery near Coalville in Leicestershire, England 2002; he made his profession on 1 October 2004 and solemn profession on 6 October 2007, and on 16 July 2011 was ordained a priest, in this community by Bishop Malcolm McMahon. From 2011 to 2013, he was a professor of Syriac language, monastic history, and Christian anthropology at the Pontifical Atheneum of St. Anselm in Rome.

== Abbatial ministry ==
Varden left teaching at St. Anselm in Rome and returned to his abbey in 2013 upon his appointment as superior administrator of the abbey. On 16 April 2015, he became the eleventh abbot of Mount St Bernard Abbey, following a further election, also becoming the first abbot to have been born outside Britain or Ireland to govern this abbey. He is the author of books and articles in the field of Christian spirituality and monasticism.

Varden is a musician and studied Gregorian chant under Mary Berry. He later co-founded the Chant Forum with Margaret Truran of Stanbrook Abbey. In 2015, Varden was interviewed as part of a BBC Four documentary, Saints and Sinners: Britain's Millennium of Monasteries, by Janina Ramirez. In 2019 he was featured in the critically acclaimed feature documentary Outside the city (2019) by Nick Hamer, which was broadcast on BBC, and distributed by Verve Pictures. It won the 2022 Sandford St Martin Award and was nominated for an RTS Award for best documentary in the UK.

== Bishop-prelacy of Trondheim ==
On 1 October 2019, he was appointed by Pope Francis prelate of the Territorial Prelature of Trondheim in his native Norway, which had been vacant for the previous ten years. His episcopal consecration was scheduled for 4 January 2020, but was postponed on account of the short sabbatical period that was granted him at his request and on account also of the restrictions that were later imposed by the spread of COVID-19. Varden's episcopal consecration took place on 3 October 2020 in Nidaros Cathedral. He is the first native Norwegian Catholic bishop in Trondheim in modern times: his five predecessors were all German missionaries. On 31 August 2023, Pope Francis also named him Apostolic Administrator of Tromsø. In February 2026, Pope Leo XIV selected Varden to preach at a week-long Lenten spiritual retreat for Leo and the Roman Curia.

== Bibliography ==
- Varden, Erik (2026). Alight with Hidden Glory: The 2026 Papal Retreat. London: Bloomsbury Continuum. ISBN 9781399434911.
- Towards Dawn: Essays in Hopefulness (Word on Fire, 2025) ISBN 9781685782740
- Varden, Erik (2024). Healing Wounds: The 2025 Lent Book. London: Bloomsbury Continuum. ISBN 9781399410403.
- Varden, Erik (2023). Chastity: Reconciliation of the Senses. London: Bloomsbury Continuum. ISBN 9781399411394.
- Varden, Erik (2023). Å fine sammen: politiske innspill. Oslo: St. Olav Forlag. ISBN 9788270244140.
- Varden, Erik (2022). Entering the Twofold Mystery: On Christian Conversion. London: Bloomsbury Continuum. ISBN 9781472979445.
- Varden, Erik (2018). The Shattering of Loneliness: On Christian Remembrance. London: Bloomsbury Continuum. ISBN 9781472953261.
  - German translation: Heimweh nach Herrlichkeit: Ein Trappist über die Fülle des Lebens (Freiburg: Herder, 2021) ISBN 9783451386886
  - Italian translation: La solitudine spezzata: Sulla memoria cristiana (Magnano: Edizioni Qiqajon, 2019) ISBN 9788882275563
  - Polish translation: Samotność przełamana (Poznań: W drodze, 2022) ISBN 9788379065356
- Varden, Erik (2011). Redeeming Freedom: The Principle of Servitude in Bérulle. Roma: Pontificio Ateneo S. Anselmo. ISBN 9783830674788.

Catholic Church titles
| Preceded by Joseph Delargy | Abbot of Mount St Bernard Abbey; 2013–2019 | Succeeded by Joseph Delargy |
| Preceded by Bernt Ivar Eidsvig (as Apostolic Administrator) | Prelate of Territorial Prelature of Trondheim; 2019–present | Incumbent |
