= Vasada =

Archaeological site

Coordinates: 37°30′07″N 31°54′42″E

Vasada (Ancient Greek: Οὐάσαδα, Ouasada) was a city of ancient Lycaonia and later of Isauria, Asia Minor (modern Turkey). It was located a little to the southwest of Laodiceia. In the acta of church councils attended by its bishop, the name appears variously as Usada or Ousada (Οὔσαδα) or Aasada (Ἀάσαδα).

Its site is located near Bostandere, Konya Province, Asiatic Turkey.

== Residential see ==
Vasada, identified with the ruins on Mount Kestel Dağ near modern Seydişehir, was important enough in the Roman province of Lycaonia to become a suffragan of the Metropolis of Iconium, under the Patriarchate of Constantinople.

These bishops were historically documented:

- Theodorus, attended the First Council of Nicaea in 325.
- Le Quien counts a bishop Severus, contemporary of Saint Basilius
- Olympius, attended the Council of Chalcedon in 451
- Gorgonius partook in the Council of Constantinople of 536
- Conone participated in the Council in Trullo in 692
- At the Council of Constantinople of 879-880 which rehabilitated Patriarch Photius, Le Quien notes both Nicephorus and Nicolaus, supporters of (and appointed by?) rival Patriarchs Photius viz. Ignatius I.

== Catholic titular see ==
The diocese was nominally restored in 1929 by the Roman Catholic Church as the titular bishopric of Vasada.

It is vacant since decades, having had the following incumbents:

- Joseph James Byrne, Holy Ghost Fathers (C.S.Sp.) (Irish) (1932.11.29 – 1953.03.25) as last Apostolic Vicar of Kilima-Njaro (Tanzania) (1932.11.29 – 1953.03.25); next (see) renamed and promoted first Bishop of Moshi (Tanzania) (1953.03.25 – 1959.05.15), emeritate as Titular Bishop of Abaradira (1959.05.15 – death 1961.10.20)
- Johann Wember, Congregation of Missionaries of the Holy Family (M.S.F.) (German) (1955.02.18 – death 1980.05.04) as first Apostolic Vicar of Northern Norway (Norway) (1955.02.18 – 1976) and on emeritate; previously last Ecclesiastical Superior of Missionary District of Northern Norway (Norway) (1939.11.17 – 1944.03.10), (see) promoted as the only Apostolic Prefect of Northern Norway (1944.03.10 – 1955.02.18).

== Sources and external links ==
- GCatholic
- Pius Bonifacius Gams, Series episcoporum Ecclesiae Catholicae, Leipzig 1931, p. 451
- Le Quien, Michel (1740). Oriens Christianus, in quatuor Patriarchatus digestus: quo exhibentur ecclesiæ, patriarchæ, cæterique præsules totius Orientis. Tomus primus: tres magnas complectens diœceses Ponti, Asiæ & Thraciæ, Patriarchatui Constantinopolitano subjectas (in Latin). Paris: Ex Typographia Regia. cols. 1075–1078. OCLC 955922585.
- Raymond Janin, lemma 1. 'Basada', in Dictionnaire d'Histoire et de Géographie ecclésiastiques, vol. VI, 1932, col. 1063
