= Fredrik Hansen =

Norwegian prelate (born 1979)

His Excellency, The Most Reverend Fredrik Hansen
- Bishop of Oslo
- Church: Roman Catholic
- See: Oslo
- Appointed: 16 July 2025
- Installed: 16 July 2025
- Predecessor: Bernt Ivar Eidsvig

Orders
- Ordination: 21 April 2007 by Bernt Ivar Eidsvig
- Consecration: 18 January 2025 by Pietro Parolin

Personal details
- Born: 13 June 1979 (age 47) Drammen, Norway
- Motto: Lex Tua veritas (Your law is truth)
- Coat of arms: Fredrik Hansen's coat of arms

Styles of Fredrik Hansen
- Reference style: His Excellency
- Spoken style: Your Excellency
- Religious style: Bishop

Ordination history of Fredrik Hansen
History
Diaconal ordination
- Ordained by: Bernt Ivar Eidsvig
Priestly ordination
- Ordained by: Bernt Ivar Eidsvig
Episcopal consecration
- Principal consecrator: Pietro Parolin
- Co-consecrators: Bernt Ivar Eidsvig, Erik Varden

Fredrik Hansen (born 13 June 1979) is a Norwegian Catholic prelate who has served as Bishop of Oslo since July 2025.

== Early life ==
Fredrik Hansen was born on 13 June 1979 in a Evangelical-Lutheran family belonging to the Church of Norway. He was converted into the Catholic Church at the age of 20 on 27 December 1999. Hansen was educated at Brunla Junior High School and the University of Oslo.

== Priestly ministry ==
After studying philosophy and theology at Allen Hall Seminary and Heythrop College, both in London, Hansen was ordained deacon on 1 July 2006, and on 21 April 2007, he was ordained priest incardinated to the Diocese of Oslo. After his priestly ordination, he held the following positions:

- Private Secretary to the Bishop of Oslo (2007–2011)
- Pro-Rector at St. Eystein Seminary (2008–2011)
- Secretary of the Norwegian Catholic Bishops' Council (2009-2011)
- Judge at the Tribunal for the Catholic Diocese of Oslo (2011–2016)

Hansen received a doctorate in canon law from the Pontifical Gregorian University in Rome in 2013, during his stay in Rome, he was the vice-rector of the Collegio Teutonico di Santa Maria dell'Anima. He was then a student at the Pontifical Ecclesiastical Academy, and in 2013, he entered the diplomatic service of the Holy See, subsequently, he was elevated to the title of Monsignor. Hansen was assigned to the Papal Nunciature in Tegucigalpa, Honduras, to the Permanent Mission of the Holy See as observer to international organizations in Vienna, and to the Permanent Mission of the Holy See to the United Nations in New York.

After completing his diplomatic service in New York, he became a candidate for Society of the Priests of Saint Sulpice on 22 July 2022. The congregation's main activity since its foundation in 1642 has been the operation of seminaries. Hansen became a professor at St. Mary's Seminary and University in Baltimore, where he taught Canon Law and Ecclesiology. In addition, he served in the role of Dean of Seminarians immediately prior to his appointment as Coadjutor Bishop of Oslo.

== Episcopal ministry ==
On 1 November 2024, Pope Francis appointed Hansen as the Coadjutor Bishop of Oslo, his episcopal consecration was held on 18 January 2025 on St. Olav's Cathedral by Cardinal Pietro Parolin. On 16 July 2025, Pope Leo XIV accepted the resignation of the Bishop of Oslo, Bernt Ivar Eidsvig; as the Coadjutor Bishop, Hansen automatically succeeded Eidsvig as the Bishop of Oslo.

Catholic Church titles
Preceded by Bernt Ivar Eidsvig	Bishop of Oslo; 2025–present	Incumbent
