= Torbjørn Olsen =

Norwegian Catholic diocesan administrator

Torbjørn Olsen (born November 10, 1953) is a Norwegian Catholic prelate who served as Diocesan Administrator of the Territorial Prelature of Tromsø from 2006 to 2009.

He holds a theology degree from the Norwegian Menighetsfakultetet granted in 1977, and he worked for about a decade as a priest in the Norwegian Church, including as a military chaplain. In 1989, he converted to Catholicism. He took the diploma degree in Catholic theology at the John-Gutenberg Universität in Mainz in 1991 and was ordained a priest in Tromsø on September 8, 1991, by Bishop Gerhard Goebel. With his thesis "Die Natur des Militärordinariats", he became the first Norwegian in recent times to take a doctorate in canon law (Doctor in iure Canonico) on February 3, 1999, at the Pontifical University of Gregorian in Rome.

Olsen has worked in various functions in the Catholic Church in Norway and in 1998 became Vicar General of Trondheim. In December 2003, he was appointed honorary chaplain to His Holiness with the title Monsignor.

== Literature ==
- Die Natur des Militärordinariats, 1998, Berlin: Duncker & Humblot
