= Territorial Prelature of Trondheim =

Latin Catholic ecclesiastical jurisdiction in Norway

Coordinates: 63.4254°N 10.3924°E

Territorial Prelature of Trondheim Praelatura Territorialis Trudensis Trondheim Stift – Midt-Norge

Catholic
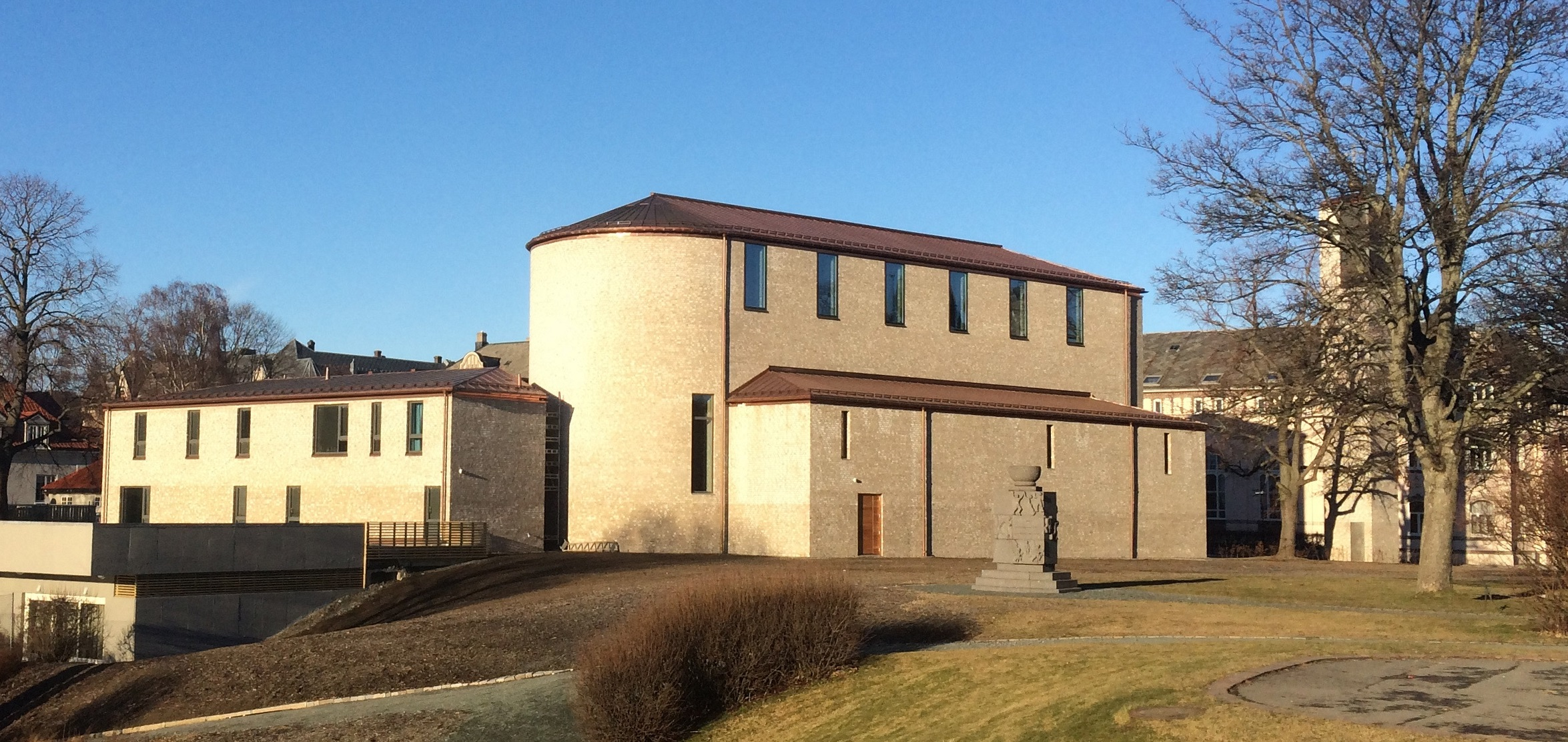
- St. Olav's Cathedral, Trondheim

- Coat of arms

Location
- Country: Norway
- Territory: Trondheim, Trondheim Region, Sør-Trøndelag
- Metropolitan: Immediately Subject to the Holy See

Statistics
- Area: 56,458 km^{2} (21,799 sq mi)
- Population: Total; Catholics: (as of 2022); 744,580; 16,530 (2.2%)
- Parishes: 5

Information
- Denomination: Catholic Church
- Sui iuris church: Latin Church
- Rite: Roman Rite
- Established: 1979 (1030–1537)
- Cathedral: St. Olav's Cathedral, Trondheim
- Secular priests: 5

Current leadership
- Pope: Leo XIV
- Bishop: Erik Varden

Website
- katolsk.no/mn

The Territorial Prelature of Trondheim is a Latin Church ecclesiastical jurisdiction of the Catholic Church, located in Norway. Before March 1979, it was known as the Apostolic Vicariate of Central Norway.

Erik Varden was appointed the bishop in 2019. The prelature includes parishes in Trondheim, Kristiansund, Levanger, Molde, and Ålesund.

== History ==
The Reformation in Norway ended organized Catholic practice in 1537. Between 1688 and 1834, northern Norway was included as part of the Apostolic Vicariate of the Nordic Missions, before it passed to the Apostolic Vicariate of Sweden in 1834. In 1855, Norway north of the Arctic Circle became part of the new Apostolic Prefecture of the North Pole, while the rest of Norway (including Trondheim) remained in the Apostolic Vicariate of Sweden. On August 17, 1869, northern Norway rejoined with the rest of Norway in the new Apostolic Prefecture of Norway, which upgraded to Apostolic Vicariate of Norway in 1892.

When the Norwegian Reformation drove the Catholic archbishop out of the archdiocese of Nidaros (Trondheim) in 1537, there were no indications of organized Catholic practice there until 1844, when five residents asked the priest in Oslo to visit them, apparently to help one of their children prepare for First Communion. The first Catholic parish was re-established in Trondheim in 1872, with French-born Claude Dumahut as the pastor. In 1875, the church bought property at Stiklestad in the hopes of building a chapel there to commemorate the martyrdom of St. Olav at the Battle of Stiklestad in 1030. Though the parish was founded and continues to be led by clergy from the Congregation of the Sacred Hearts of Jesus and Mary, several monastic orders – including the Salesians, Sisters of St. Joseph and Order of St. Elisabeth – tried with mixed success to establish themselves in the area. A seminary was established in 1880, graduating a small group of priests in 1885, who made the first pilgrimage to Stiklestad in hundreds of years.

Additional parishes were founded in Trondheim (Sacred Heart in 1881 and St. Olav in 1902; later merged as St. Olav), Molde (1923), and in 1930 the chapel at Stiklestad was complete in time for the 900th anniversary of the battle there.

On 10 April 1931, the Apostolic Vicariate of Norway was divided into three jurisdictions, originally two mission sui iuris (missions in areas with very few Catholics, often desolate or remote) and a marginally more populated apostolic vicariate. Over the remainder of the 20th century, as the Catholic population grew in these areas, and as transportation infrastructure overcame some of the remoteness, these jurisdictions have advanced through apostolic prefecture, apostolic vicariate, two have grown to territorial prelature, and one jurisdiction has grown to become a full diocese.

The jurisdiction for southern Norway started as the Apostolic Vicariate of Oslo (1931–1953), growing quickly enough to become the Diocese of Oslo in 1953. The jurisdiction for Norway north of the polar circle started as the Missionary District of Northern Norway (1931–1944), growing to the Apostolic Prefecture of Northern Norway (1944–1955), the Apostolic Vicariate of Northern Norway (1955–1979), and the Territorial Prelature of Tromsø on 28 March 1979.

The jurisdiction for central Norway started as the Missionary District of Central Norway (1931–1935), growing to the Apostolic Prefecture of Central Norway (1935–1953), the Apostolic Vicariate of Central Norway (1953–1979), then the Territorial Prelature of Trondheim.

During the occupation of Norway by Nazi Germany, the mostly German-born clergy in central Norway took part in the Norwegian resistance movement; one of them, Antonius Deutsch, was subsequently decorated by king Haakon VII.

In 1989, Pope John Paul II visited Trondheim and held an ecumenical service in the Church of Norway's Nidaros Cathedral, as well as a Catholic Mass at a nearby sports facility. In 1993, the Church of Norway authorized a full Catholic Mass to be held in the Nidaros Cathedral, for the first time since the 1537 Reformation.

== Leadership ==
=== Under the apostolic vicariate in Sweden (until 1868) ===
- 1843–1868 - Laurentius J. Studach (resident in Sweden)

=== The apostolic prefecture in Norway (1869–1892) ===
- 1869–1887 - Bernard Bernard
- 1887–1892 - Johannes Olav Fallize

=== The apostolic vicariate in Norway (1892–1931) ===
- 1892–1922 - Johannes Olaf Fallize
- 1922–1928 - Johannes Olav Smit
- 1928–1930 - Olav Offerdahl
- 1930–1931 - Henrik Irgens (apostolic administrator)

=== The missionary district of Central Norway (1931–1935) ===
- 1931–1932 - Henrik Irgens (apostolic administrator)
- 1932–1935 - Cyprian Witte SS.CC.

=== The apostolic prefecture Central Norway ===
- 1935–1945 - Cyprian Witte SS.CC.
- 1945–1953 - Antonius Deutsch SS.CC.

=== The apostolic vicariate Central Norway ===
- 1953–1974 - Johannes Rüth SS.CC.
- 1974–1979 - Gerhard Schwenzer SS.CC.

=== Trondheim prelature ===
- 1979–1983 - Gerhard Schwenzer SS.CC.
- 1983–1988 - Gerhard Schwenzer, administrator sede vacante
- 1988–1997 - Georg Müller SS.CC., administrator sede vacante
- 1997–2009 - Georg Müller SS.CC.
- 2009–2019 - Bernt Ivar Eidsvig C.R.S.A., administrator sede vacante
- 2020–present - Erik Varden, O.C.S.O.

== See also ==
- Catholic Church in Norway
- Diocese of Oslo (Catholic)
- Territorial Prelature of Tromsø
- Nidaros Cathedral

== Sources ==
- History of Trondheim prelature on the Catholic church's website in Norway
