= St. Olav's Cathedral, Trondheim =

Coordinates: 63.4253°N 10.3925°E

St. Olav's Cathedral
- St. Olav domkirke
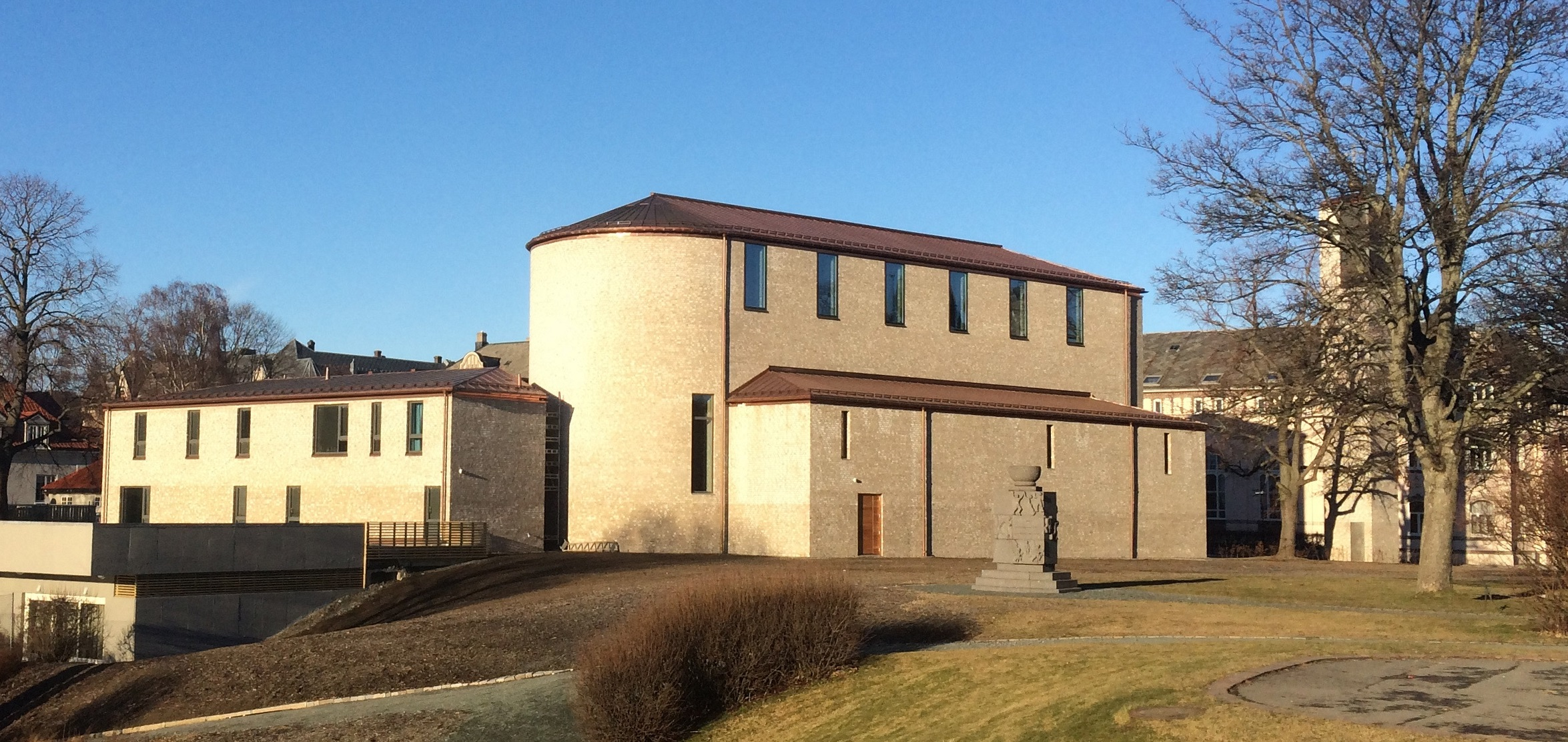
- The new cathedral photographed in 2016
- St. Olav's Cathedral
- Location: Trondheim
- Country: Norway
- Denomination: Catholic Church

The St. Olav's Cathedral (Norwegian: St. Olav domkirke) is the church home to the Prelature of Trondheim, belonging to the Catholic Church in Norway.

It is built on the foundations of a cathedral designed by architect Per Kartvedt that was consecrated in 1973 to serve as the new church of the Vicariate of Trondheim.

== History ==
In 1979 it was elevated from Rome to the status of cathedral, while the vicarage was converted into a prelature.

Bishop Bernt Ivar Eidsvig initiated a committee to plan a new cathedral in 2009 and the year after the architectural firm Eggen Arkitekter AS got the assignment. The previous church was demolished on 25 May 2014. The new church was finished in November 2016.
