= Volkesfeld =

- Municipality
- Coat of arms

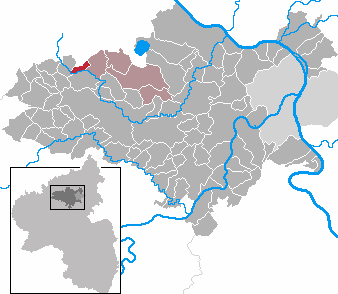
- Location of Volkesfeld within Mayen-Koblenz district
- Interactive map of Volkesfeld
- Location within Germany Location within Rhineland-Palatinate
- Coordinates: 50°23′31″N 7°9′02″E
- Country: Germany
- State: Rhineland-Palatinate
- District: Mayen-Koblenz
- Municipal assoc.: Mendig

Government
  - Mayor (2019–24): Rudolf Wingender

Area
  - Total: 2.58 km^{2} (1.00 sq mi)
- Elevation: 400 m (1,300 ft)

Population (2025-12-31)
  - Total: 547
  - Density: 212/km^{2} (549/sq mi)
- Time zone: UTC+01:00 (CET)
  - Summer (DST): UTC+02:00 (CEST)
- Postal codes: 56745
- Dialling codes: 02655
- Vehicle registration: MYK
- Website: www.volkesfeld.de

Volkesfeld (German pronunciation: [ˈfɔlkəsfɛlt]) is a municipality in the district of Mayen-Koblenz in Rhineland-Palatinate, western Germany.
