= John Willem Gran =

Norwegian Catholic bishop (1920–2008)

The Most Reverend John Willem Gran
- Bishop of Oslo
- Church: Roman Catholic
- Diocese: Oslo
- Installed: 25 November 1964
- Term ended: 26 November 1983
- Predecessor: Jacques Mangers
- Successor: Gerhard Schwenzer
- Previous post: Coadjutor Bishop of Oslo (1962-1964)

Orders
- Ordination: 21 May 1957 by Johannes Theodor Suhr
- Consecration: 24 Mar 1963 by Jacques Mangers
- Rank: Bishop

Personal details
- Born: 5 April 1920 Bergen, Norway
- Died: 20 March 2008 (aged 87) Paris, France
- Buried: Bergen, Norway
- Coat of arms

Willem Nicolaysen Gran (monastic name: John; 5 April 1920 – 20 March 2008) Norwegian Catholic who was the bishop of the Roman Catholic Diocese of Oslo from 1963 to 1983.

== Life ==
Gran traveled Europe at the end of the 1930s, with plans to take a degree in opera. When German forces invaded Norway in 1940, he was stuck in Italy and here he met active young Catholics. Though baptised at birth in the Norwegian Protestant Church, he had regarded himself as an atheist, considering Buddhist practice for a brief period. Gran converted to Roman Catholicism in 1941, and was confirmed in St Peter's Basilica.

During World War II, Gran did military service, first stationed in London and then in peacetime he was posted in Norway, where in 1945-1946 he was a liaison officer at Akershus Fortress. During 1946–7, after discharge, he worked in the film industry as assistant director on Operation Swallow, which documented the Norwegian heavy water sabotage.

Gran felt an attraction to the monastic life, and in November 1949 he entered the Cistercian Trappist monastery on Caldey Island off the coast of Pembrokeshire in Wales. He took the name John. After theological studies at the monastery of Scourmont in Belgium, he was ordained a priest in Caldey Abbey in 1957 by Bishop Theodor Suhr OSB from Copenhagen.

Two years later he was sent to Rome for further theological studies and earned a licentiate. From 1960 to 1963 he served in the Order in Rome as a financial administrator. On 27 December 1962, Pope John XXIII named him Coadjutor-Bishop (Assistant Bishop) with the right of succession in Oslo, and titular Bishop of Raphia. On 24 March 1963 he was consecrated in St Olav's cathedral in Oslo. He was appointed as Bishop of Oslo after Jacob Mangers on 13 December 1964, and was in office until 26 November 1983, when he resigned.

As the newly appointed bishop, he was the only Norwegian to participate in the Second Vatican Council in Rome. Gran was a member of the Pontifical Secretariat for Christian Unity until 1970, and a member of the Pontifical Secretariat for Dialogue with Non-believers until 1984. In 1984 he was appointed Commander of the Order of St Olav.

In his later years he lived most of the time on Corsica. Bishop Gran died on 20 March 2008 in Paris, and was buried in Bergen on 3 April 2008. He was the first Catholic bishop to be buried in Bergen since 1522, when Bishop Andor Ketilsson was buried there.

== Second Vatican Council ==
In 2001, he published "Det annet Vatikankonsil: oppbrudd og fornyelse"(The second Vatican council: departure and renewal), detailing his recollections of the council. He was part of the preparatory commission led by Cardinal Bea, and during the council he held a speech in favor of religious freedom.
