= Olaf Offerdahl =

Norwegian Catholic bishop (1857–1930)

His Excellency Olaf Offerdahl
- Vicar Apostolic of Norway
- Church: Roman Catholic
- See: Oslo
- Appointed: 12 March 1930
- Term ended: 7 October 1930
- Predecessor: Johannes Olav Smit
- Successor: Jacques Mangers
- Other post: Titular Bishop of Selia
- Previous post: Apostolic Administrator of Norway (1928-1930)

Orders
- Ordination: 22 November 1891 by Lucido Parocchi
- Consecration: 6 April 1930 by Willem Marinus van Rossum

Personal details
- Born: 12 December 1857 Årdal, Sogn, Norway
- Died: 7 October 1930 (aged 72) Bussum, Netherlands

Olaf Offerdahl (12 December 1857, Årdal, Sogn, Norway – 7 October 1930, Bussum, Netherlands) was apostolic administrator for Norway from 1928 to March 1930, when he was promoted to apostolic vicar. In April 1930 he became the bishop of Selia, which he remained until his death later the same year. He was the first ethnic Norwegian bishop to be appointed in Norway since the Reformation. Notable he translated the New Testament in to Norwegian.

== Life and work ==
He was born on the croft Kleivi in Årdal Municipality, Sogn. The family took the name of the farm the croft was a part of, Ofredal. Offerdahl studied to become a teacher in Balestrand Municipality, and graduated in 1879.

In 1880 he met C. Holfeldt-Houen and JD Stubbegan, both catholic priests while working at Catholic St. Paul's Primary School in Bergen, and converted from the Lutheran Norwegian Church to the Catholic Church.

In autumn 1884, he began studying for the priesthood in Turnhout, Belgium. He passed his student exam in 1886. From there he studied philosophy and theology at Urbana Collegio de Propaganda Fide in Rome, a missionary college. 22 Nov 1891 he was ordained a priest by Cardinal Lucido Maria Parocchi.

The summer of 1892 he returned to Norway where he became the chaplain of Tromsø Municipality. January 23, 1884 he was appointed acting priest of Tromsø until July 27, 1895 when become the parish priest. Transferred to St. Olav Church in Oslo he was a chaplain from 1897 to 1907, when he was promoted to parish priest. A position he held until 1923. For around the next year he served as parish priest in Arendal before moving to St. Hallvard's church in Oslo June 1, 1924. Pope Pius XI granted him the title monsignor when he was appointed household prelate and papal chamberlain in 1925. Also in March 1925 he became the provost for the apostolic vicariate of Norway, in June he became pro-vicar for Norway.

He served as a parish priest and provost until he was required to step up as apostolic administrator of Norway in 1928. Bishop JO Smit, his superior, was called to Rome related to conflict in the church that year. After serving only a year and a half in that position he was promoted to apostolic vicar, leader of the apostolic vicariate of Norway, on March 13, 1930. April 3rd 1930 he was appointed Titular Bishop of Selia, and was ordained on the 6th by Cardinal Wilhelm van Rossum.

That fall, he became seriously ill during a trip to the Netherlands. On 7 October 1930, he died in Bussum, Netherlands. He is buried at Our Savior's Cemetery in Oslo.

== Time as a provost ==
Offerdahl worked under Bishop JO Smit as a provost. The bishop's leadership was poor, resulting in destructive conflict. Despite the turmoil Offerdahl was seen as trustworthy and doing his best. His reputation as a good leader undoubtedly led to his consideration for bishop.

== Celebration of the 900th anniversary St. Olaf winning the Battle of Stiklestad ==
It is believed that celebrating the introduction of Christianity into Norway's 900th anniversary played a major role in Offerdahl's appointment as bishop.

Offerdalh made the controversial decision to not allow the Catholic Church of Norway to celebrate the introduction of Christianity to Norway with the Church of Norway, rather he insisted upon a separate celebrations for Catholics. It was his view that the introduction of Catholic Christianity was the purpose of the celebration and did not want to mingle it with the views of the Church of Norway. On the committee who helped prepare the Catholic celebrations were authors Lars Eskeland and Sigrid Undset, the latter of which compared Offerdahl to medieval episcopal figures.

== Economic concerns as bishop ==
The Catholic Church in Norway was not in a good financial situation when Offerdahl became bishop. Hoping for financial help from dutch bishops and benefactors Offerdahl went to the Netherlands in September 1930. His requests for help were well received. While on this trip he died at the Franciscan Sisters' postulant house St. Olavshuis in Bussum, October 7, 1930.

== Works ==
- Editor for St. Olaf 1897–1907
- Translated the New Testament to Norwegian 1902
- Wrote Catholic Practice 1903
- Wrote To St. Joseph
- Translated David's Psalms
