= St. Olav's Cathedral, Oslo =

St. Olav's Cathedral
- Sankt Olav domkirke
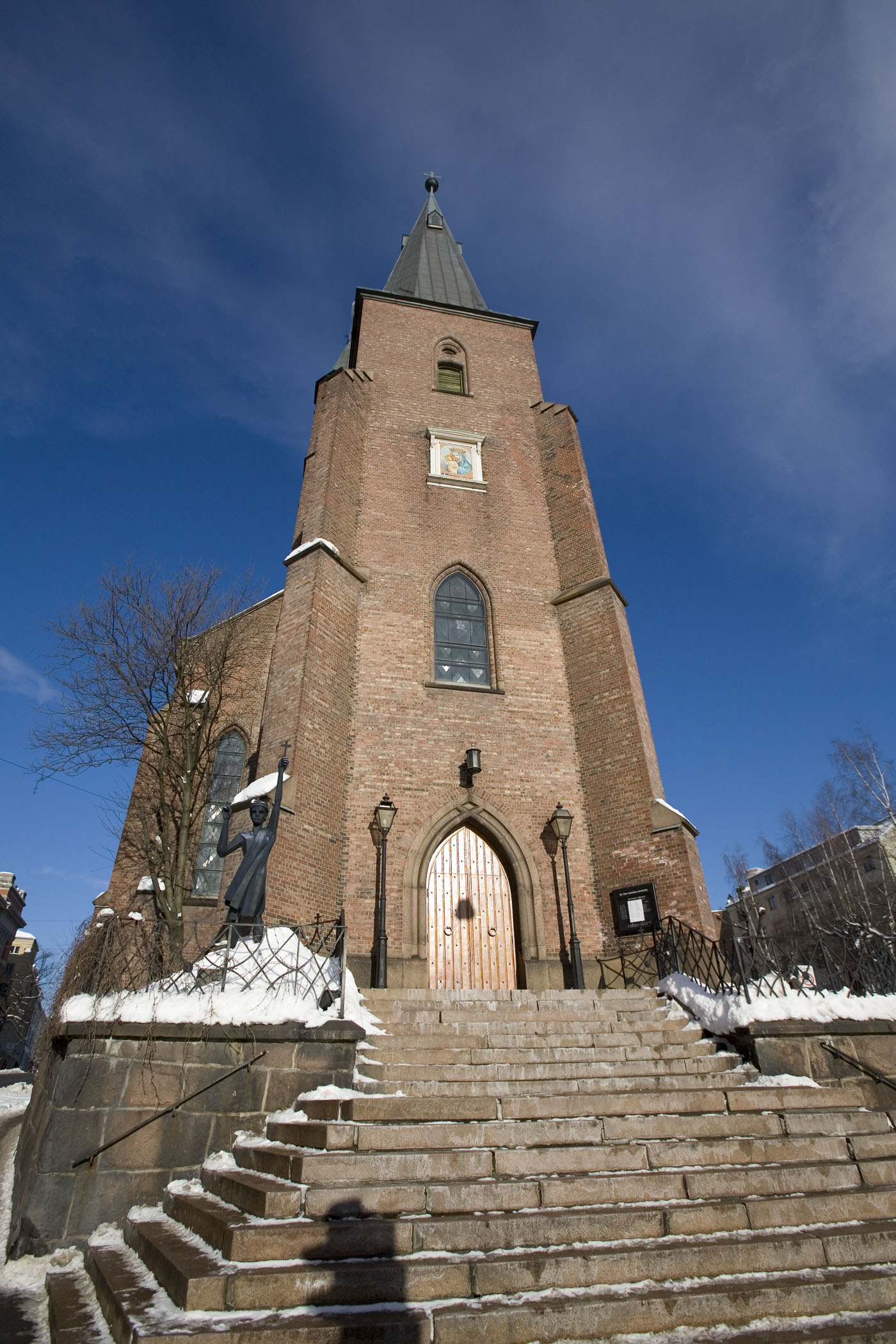
- St. Olav's Cathedral
- 59°55′5.3616″N 10°44′38.886″E
- Location: Oslo
- Country: Norway
- Denomination: Roman Catholic
- Website: Website

History
- Status: Cathedral
- Founded: 1896
- Dedication: Saint Olav

Architecture
- Functional status: Active
- Architect(s): Heinrich Ernst Schirmer and Wilhelm von Hanno
- Architectural type: Neo-Gothic

Administration
- Diocese: Oslo
- Parish: St. Olav

Clergy
- Bishop: Fredrik Hansen
- Rector: Fr. Carlo Borromeo Le Hong Phuc

St. Olav's Cathedral (Norwegian: Sankt Olav domkirke) is the cathedral of the Roman Catholic Diocese of Oslo and the parish church of St. Olav's parish in Oslo, Norway. The cathedral has church services and masses in Norwegian and several other languages, including English and Polish.

== History ==
At the time of construction, this church, being built at Hammersborg, near the graveyard of Our Saviour (Norwegian: Vår Frelsers gravlund), was located in the countryside outside the then city of Oslo. The work was funded by private donations and fundraising abroad, the most generous individual donor being Queen Josephine, who was a Catholic herself. The first mass of the church was celebrated on 24 August 1856, but as there was no Roman Catholic bishop in the country, the church was not consecrated until 8 August 1896.

A relic, reportedly a bone from St. Olav's arm, has been placed in a showcase since the 1860s. When the Roman Catholic Diocese of Oslo was established in 1953, St. Olav's was chosen as the episcopal seat and was elevated to the rank of cathedral. It is the second Catholic cathedral in Oslo. was visited by Pope John Paul II visited St. Olav's Cathedral during his 1989 tour of the Scandinavian countries.

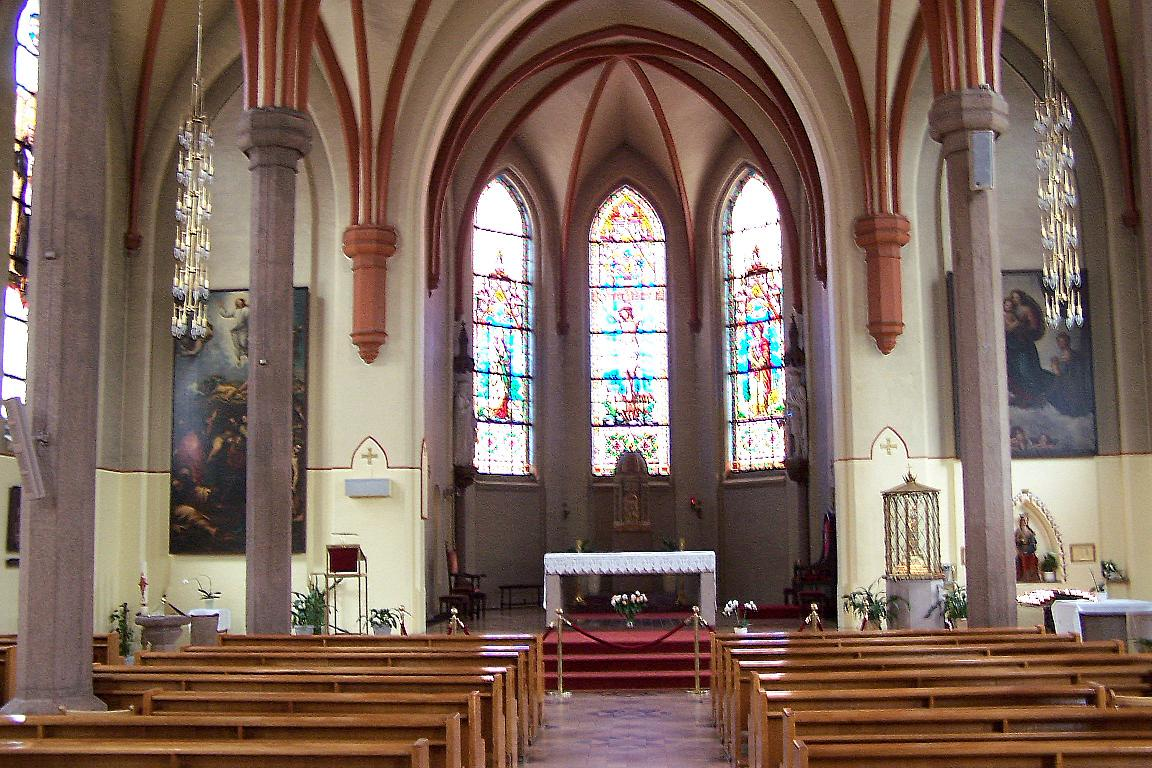
St. Olav's Cathedral interior

== See also ==
- List of cathedrals in Norway
- List of Roman Catholic parishes in Norway
- Roman Catholicism in Norway
- St. Hallvard's Cathedral
