= Roman Catholic Diocese of Oslo =

Latin Catholic diocese in Norway

Coordinates: 59.9182°N 10.7441°E

Diocese of Oslo Dioecesis Osloënsis Oslo Bispedømme

Catholic

Location
- Country: Norway
- Metropolitan: Immediately Subject to the Holy See

Statistics
- Area: 154,443 km^{2} (59,631 sq mi)
- Population: Total; Catholics: (as of 2022); ▲4,200,150; ▲145,120 (▲3.5%)

Information
- Sui iuris church: Latin Church
- Rite: Roman Rite
- Cathedral: St. Olav's Cathedral in Oslo

Current leadership
- Pope: Leo XIV
- Bishop: Fredrik Hansen
- Bishops emeritus: Bernt Ivar Eidsvig

The Diocese of Oslo (Latin: Dioecesis Osloënsis) is an exempt Latin Catholic diocese of the Catholic Church located in the city of Oslo in Norway.

== Parishes ==
The territory is divided into 25 parishes, located in the following sites: Oslo (3), Moss, Askim, Fredrikstad, Halden, Lillestrøm, Hamar, Kongsvinger, Lillehammer, Jessheim, Hønefoss, Stabekk, Drammen, Fagernes, Tønsberg, Larvik, Sandefjord, Porsgrunn, Arendal, Kristiansand, Stavanger, Haugesund, and Bergen.

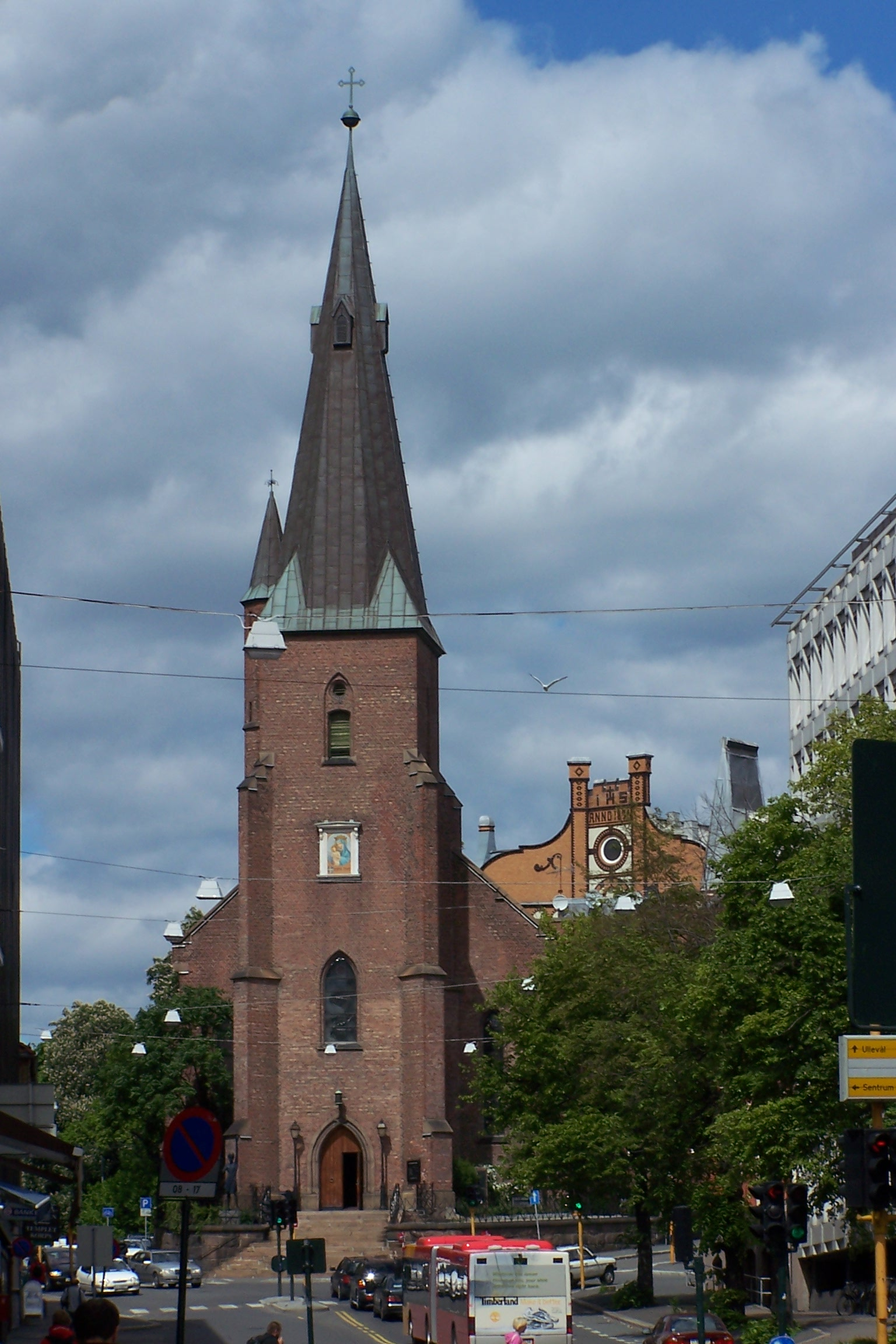
St. Olav's Cathedral

== History ==
By 1070, the see was established as the Diocese of Oslo, and the bishop was seated at St. Hallvard's Cathedral. In 1537—in the course of the Lutheran Reformation in Denmark-Norway and Holstein—Christian III of Denmark suppressed the Catholic episcopates at the Norwegian sees. Thereafter Lutheranism prevailed in Scandinavia.

In 1582 the stray Catholics in Norway and elsewhere in Northern Europe were placed under the jurisdiction of a papal nuncio in Cologne. The Congregation de propaganda fide, on its establishment in 1622, took charge of the vast missionary field, which—at its third session—it divided among the nuncio of Brussels (for the Catholics in Denmark and Norway), the nuncio at Cologne (much of Northern Germany) and the nuncio to Poland (Finland, Mecklenburg, and Sweden).

In 1688 Norway became part of the Apostolic Vicariate of the Nordic Missions. The Paderborn bishops functioned as administrators of the apostolic vicariate. In 1834 the Catholic missions in Norway became part of the Apostolic Vicariate of Sweden, seated in the Swedish capital Stockholm. Whereas Norway north of the polar circle became the Apostolic Prefecture of the North Pole in 1855, the rest of Norway stayed with the Swedish vicariate. When a new Catholic missionary jurisdiction was established, it was not at any of the ancient episcopal sees but a mission “sui iuris” on 7 August 1868, created out of parts of North Pole prefecture and the Norwegian part of the Swedish vicariate. On 17 August 1869 the mission became the apostolic prefecture of Norway. On 11 March 1892 the Apostolic Prefecture of Norway was promoted to Apostolic Vicariate of Norway, with an altered name as the Apostolic Vicariate of Norway and Spitsbergen between 1 June 1913 and 15 December 1925.

On 10 April 1931 the apostolic vicariate was divided into the Apostolic Vicariate of Oslo (extant 1931–1953; comprising southern Norway), a Catholic jurisdiction for central Norway (called Missionary District of Central Norway, 1931–1935; Apostolic Prefecture of Central Norway, 1935–1953; Apostolic Vicariate of Central Norway, 1953–1979; Prelature of Trondheim since), and a jurisdiction for Norway north of the polar circle (called Missionary District of Northern Norway, 1931–1944; Apostolic Prefecture of Northern Norway, 1944–1955; Apostolic Vicariate of Northern Norway, 1955–1979; Prelature of Tromsø since). On 29 June 1953 the Apostolic Vicariate of Oslo became a separate Roman Catholic diocese, when the same status was given in Sweden to the Stockholm diocese.

On 26 February 2015, Norwegian authorities levelled charges of fraud against the Diocese of Oslo and Bishop Bernt Ivar Eidsvig. According to the charges, the diocese is under suspicion of registering people as members of the Catholic Church in Norway without their knowing or consent and over the course of several years fraudulently claiming membership grants from the Norwegian government to the amount of 50 million kr. In connection with the case, Norwegian police raided the offices of the diocese. The diocese was found guilty and ordered to pay a fine of 2 million kr while the bishop was acquitted.

== Leadership ==
Unusually for a Scandinavian diocese, a majority of Oslo's bishops have been drawn from the local ethnic population (that is, Norwegian).

Prefects Apostolic of Norway

- Fr. Johannes Olav Fallize (February 6, 1887 – March 11, 1892)

Vicars Apostolic of Norway

- Bishop Johannes Olav Fallize (March 11, 1892 – June 1, 1913)

Vicars Apostolic of Norway and Spitsbergen

- Bishop Johannes Olav Fallize (June 1, 1913 – June 21, 1922)
- Bishop Johannes Olav Smit (April 11, 1922 – December 25, 1925)

Vicars Apostolic of Norway

- Bishop Johannes Olav Smit (December 15, 1925 – October 11, 1928)
- Bishop Olaf Offerdahl (March 13, 1930 – October 7, 1930; October 11, 1928 – March 13, 1930, as apostolic administrator)

Vicars Apostolic of Oslo

- Bishop Jacques Mangers, S.M. (July 12, 1932 – June 29, 1953)

Bishops of Oslo

- Bishop Jacques Mangers, S.M. (June 29, 1953 – November 25, 1964)
- Bishop John Willem Gran, O.C.S.O. (November 25, 1964 – November 2, 1983)
- Bishop Gerhard Schwenzer, SS.CC. (November 26, 1983 – July 29, 2005)
- Bishop Bernt Ivar Eidsvig, C.R.S.A.(July 29, 2005 – July 16, 2025)
- Bishop Fredrik Hansen, (July 16, 2025 – present)

== See also ==
- List of Catholic dioceses in Norway
- List of Catholic parishes in Norway
- List of Catholic dioceses in Europe (Incl. Episcopal Conference of Scandinavia)
- St. Olav's Cathedral in Oslo
- St. Hallvard's Church and Monastery
- St. Ansgar's Church, Kristiansand
- Saint Paul Catholic Church, Bergen
- Catholic Church in Norway
- Territorial Prelature of Trondheim
- Territorial Prelature of Tromsø
- St Svithun's Church, Stavanger
- Vår Frue Church (Porsgrunn)
