= Roman Catholic Territorial Prelature of Tromsø =

Territorial Prelature

Coordinates: 69.6517°N 18.9569°E

Territorial Prelature of Tromsø Praelatura Territorialis Tromsoeanus

Catholic

Location
- Country: Norway
- Metropolitan: Immediately Subject to the Holy See

Statistics
- Area: 170,405 km^{2} (65,794 sq mi)
- Population: Total; Catholics: (as of 2022); 484,831; 7,172 (1.5%)

Information
- Denomination: Catholic
- Sui iuris church: Latin Church
- Rite: Roman Rite
- Cathedral: Vår Frue Kirke, Tromsø
- Apostolic Administrator: Erik Varden
- Bishops emeritus: Berislav Grgić

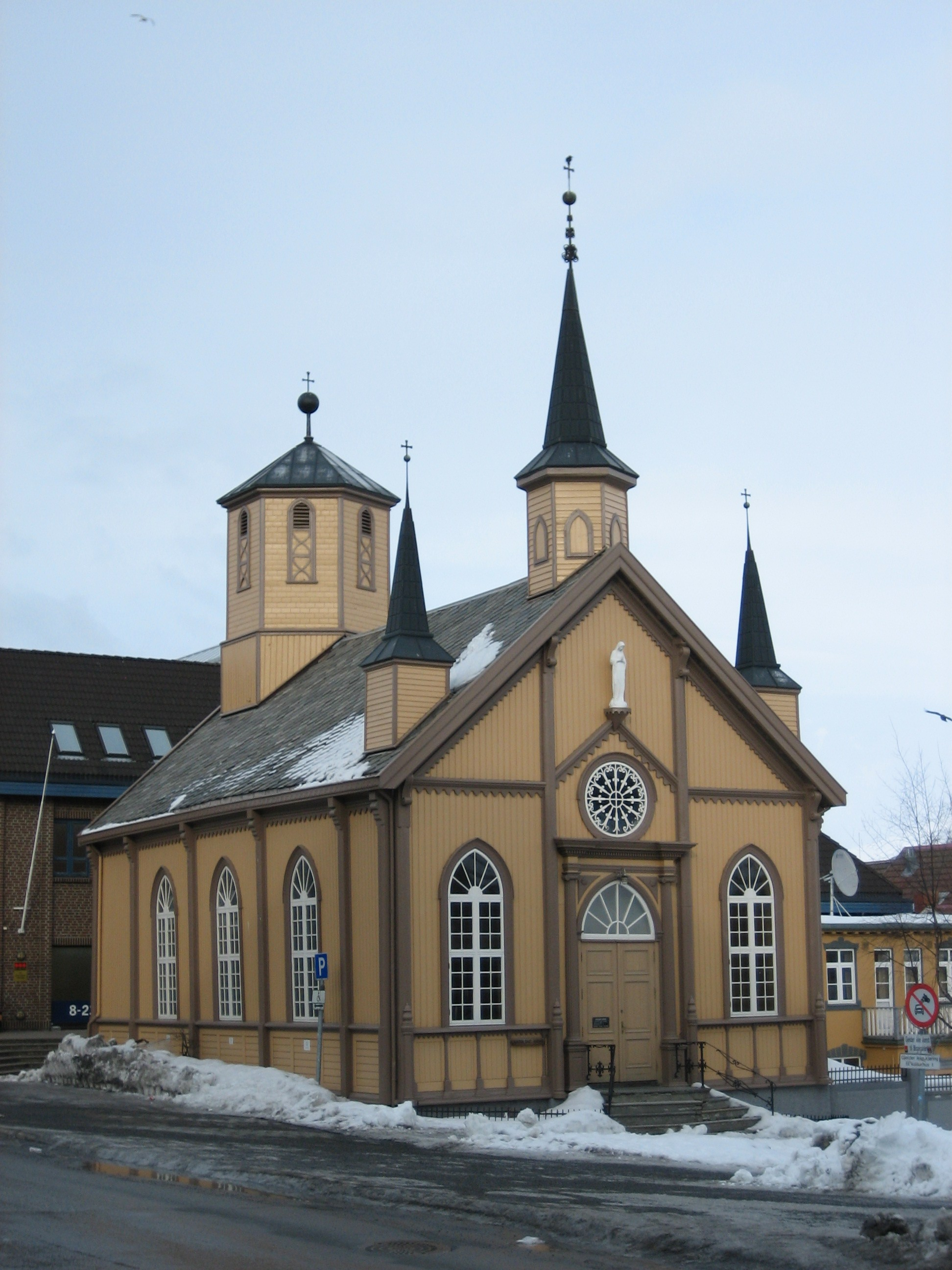
Cathedral

The Territorial Prelature of Tromsø (Latin: Praelatura Territorialis Tromsoeanus) is a Catholic territorial prelature located in the city of Tromsø in Norway. The territory is divided into 7 parishes located in the following sites: Tromsø, Bodø, Hammerfest, Harstad, Mosjøen, Narvik and Storfjord.

== History ==
The Reformation in Norway ended organized Catholic practice in 1537. Between 1688 and 1834, northern Norway was included as part of the Apostolic Vicariate of the Nordic Missions, before it passed to the Apostolic Vicariate of Sweden in 1834. In 1855, Norway north of the Arctic Circle became part of the new Apostolic Prefecture of the North Pole. This only lasted until August 17, 1869, when northern Norway rejoined with the rest of Norway in the new Apostolic Prefecture of Norway (upgraded to Apostolic Vicariate of Norway in 1892).

In 1931, the Apostolic Vicariate of Norway was divided into three jurisdictions, originally two mission sui iuris (missions in areas with very few Catholics, often desolate or remote) and a marginally more populated apostolic vicariate. Over the remainder of the 20th century, as the Catholic population grew in these areas, and as transportation infrastructure overcame some of the remoteness, these jurisdictions have advanced through apostolic prefecture, apostolic vicariate, two have grown to territorial prelature, with one jurisdiction growing to become a full diocese.

The jurisdiction for southern Norway started as the Apostolic Vicariate of Oslo (1931–1953), growing quickly enough to become the Diocese of Oslo in 1953. The jurisdiction for central Norway started as the Missionary District of Central Norway (1931–1935), growing to the Apostolic Prefecture of Central Norway (1935–1953), the Apostolic Vicariate of Central Norway (1953–1979), then the Territorial Prelature of Trondheim.

The jurisdiction for Norway north of the polar circle started as the Missionary District of Northern Norway (1931–1944), growing to the Apostolic Prefecture of Northern Norway (1944–1955), the Apostolic Vicariate of Northern Norway (1955–1979), and the Territorial Prelature of Tromsø on 28 March 1979.

== Leadership ==
- Prelates of Tromsø
  - Apostolic Administrator Eric Varden (August 31, 2023 –)
  - Bishop Berislav Grgić (December 18, 2008 – August 31, 2023)
  - Bishop Gerhard Ludwig Goebel, M.S.F. (March 29, 1979 – November 4, 2006)
- Vicars Apostolic of Northern Norway
  - Bishop João Batista Przyklenk, M.S.F. (March 1, 1976 – February 19, 1977)
  - Bishop Johann Wember, M.S.F. (February 18, 1955 – 1976)
- Prefects Apostolic of Northern Norway
  - Fr. Johann Wember, M.S.F. (later Bishop) (March 10, 1944 – February 18, 1955)
- Ecclesiastical Superiors of Northern Norway
  - Fr. Johann Wember, M.S.F. (later Bishop) (November 17, 1939 – March 10, 1944)
  - Fr. Giovanni Starcke, M.S.F. (December 5, 1931 – 1939)

== See also ==
- Torbjørn Olsen, 2006-2009 diocesan administrator
- Catholic Church in Norway
- Diocese of Oslo (Catholic)
- Territorial Prelature of Trondheim
