= Gerhard Schwenzer =

German Roman Catholic bishop (1938–2026)

Gerhard Schwenzer (1 October 1938 – 8 November 2026) was a German Roman Catholic prelate. He was bishop of Oslo from 1983 to 2005. Schwenzer died on 8 November 2026, at the age of 88.
