= Grung =

Grung is a surname. Notable people with the surname include:

- Anne Hege Grung, Norwegian priest
- Geir Grung (architect) (1926–1989), Norwegian architect
- Geir Grung (diplomat) (1938–2005), Norwegian diplomat
- Grace Elisabeth Grung (1889–1974), Norwegian actress
- Grace Grung (1895–1988), Norwegian actress
- Leif Grung (1894–1945), Norwegian architect
- Ruth Mari Grung, Norwegian politician
