= Geir Grung =

Geir Grung may refer to:

- Geir Grung (architect) (1926–1989), Norwegian architect
- Geir Grung (diplomat) (1938–2005), Norwegian diplomat
