= Hamarhus =

Coordinates: 60°47′33″N 11°02′23″E

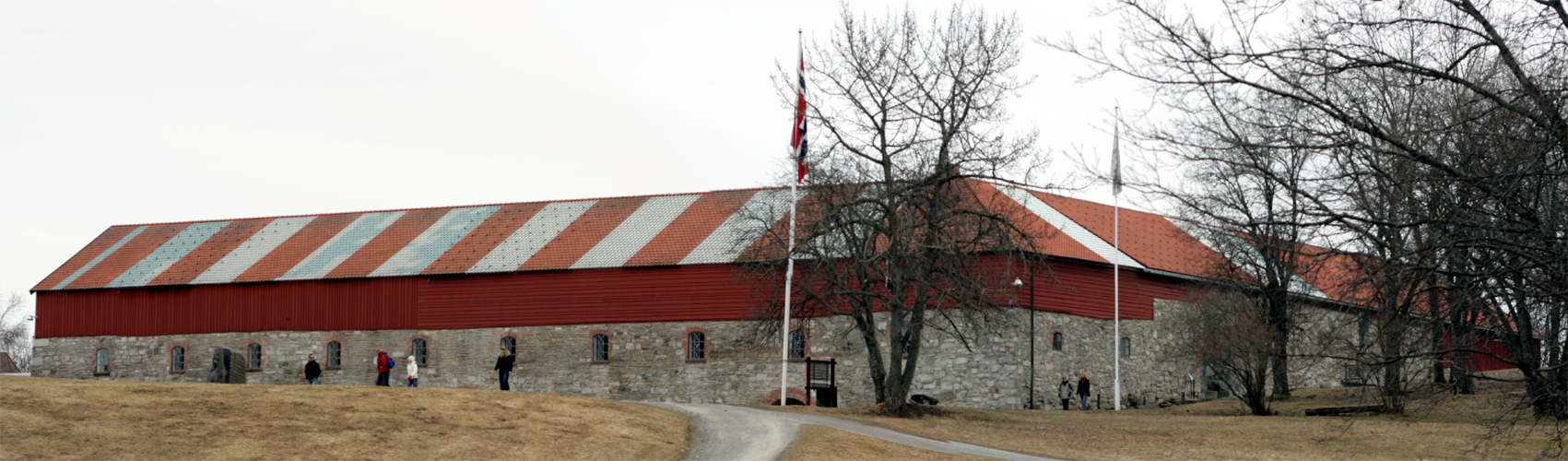
Storhamarlåven at the Cathedral Ruins in Hamar

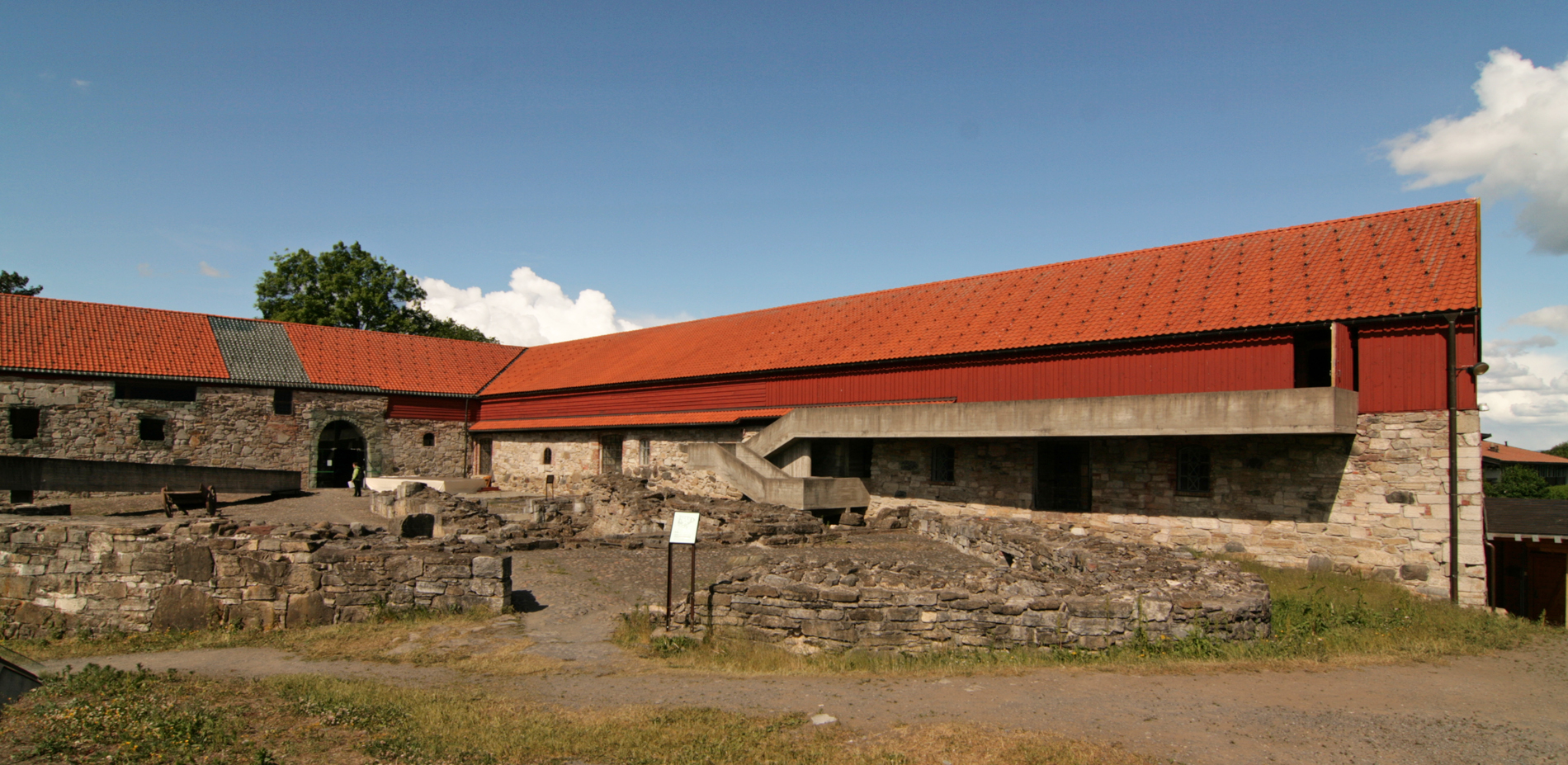
Entrance to Storhamarlåven

Hamarhus at Hamar in Hedmark, Norway was originally the fortified palace of the Bishop of the Ancient Diocese of Hamar. It is now the site of Storhamarlåven, an exhibit of Anno Museum.

== History ==
The palace was east for Hamar Cathedral, and was linked to the cathedral. The palace was constructed in stages, the oldest parts of stonework was erected around 1250 or a little later, and consists of three vault cellars white wooden roofing, and a large castle tower with ground floor approx, 10 x 18 m, with basement. After the reformation, the former bishop's residence was used by the local Lensherren. Both Hamarhus and Hamar Cathedral were destroyed in 1567 by the Swedish armies during the Northern Seven Years' War. The ruins of Hamarhus were later converted into the barn and outbuilding on Storhamar farm. The barn was built in the 18th and 19th century, using the ruins of the medieval bishop's palace as parts of the walls.

== Storhamarlåven ==
The Storhamar barn (Storhamarlåven) and former farm buildings were converted into a museum between 1967 and 1979. Storhamarlåven was designed by architect Sverre Fehn (1924–2009) in concrete, wood and glass to contrast with the stone of the medieval ruins. Sverre Fehn included modern installations while preserving historical remain as well as providing the further archeological excavations. Construction work began in 1969, the barn was completed in 1971 and the south wing with the auditorium in 1973. The exhibitions were completed in 1979.

== See also ==
- Cathedral Ruins in Hamar

== Other Sources ==
- Ersland, Geir Atle; Sandvik, Hilde (1999). Norsk historie 1300-1625 ( Oslo: Samlaget) ISBN 82-521-5182-5
- Gjerset, Knut (1915) History of the Norwegian People (The MacMillan Company, Volume II)
- Gunnarsjaa, Arne (2006) Norges Arkitekturhistorie (Abstrakt forlag) ISBN 9788279351276
