= List of Catholic dioceses in Norway =

The Catholic Church in Norway (where the state church is Lutheran) and its overseas territories has no ecclesiastical province nor belongs to any (all sees being exempt, i.e. directly subject to the Holy See) nor has a national episcopal conference, but the Norwegian Catholic episcopate partaticipates in the Episcopal conference of Scandinavia.

The three territorial sees are all part of the Latin Church:

- one diocese in the national capital
- two missionary territorial prelatures

The Eastern Catholics are pastorally served by a transnational apostolic exarchate from Germany.

There formally is also an Apostolic Nunciature to Norway, as papal embassy-level diplomatic representation, albeit vested in the Apostolic Nunciature to Sweden (in Djursholm), as are the nunciatures to Denmark, Finland and Iceland, covering the Nordic countries.

== Current jurisdictions ==
=== Latin jurisdictions ===
- Diocese of Oslo, which also covers Bouvet Island
- Territorial Prelature of Tromsø, which also covers Svalbard and Jan Mayen (Spitzbergen)
- Territorial Prelature of Trondheim

=== Eastern Catholic jurisdiction ===
Ukrainian Catholic Church (Byzantine rite in Ukrainian language)

- Ukrainian Catholic Apostolic Exarchate in Germany and Scandinavia, also covering Germany (with the see in Münich), Denmark, Finland and Sweden

== Defunct Latin jurisdictions ==
Early in the 11th century, Norway became christianed. In the Middle Ages, Norway's territory was different, greater than the present. Below is a list of dioceses within the then boundaries, before the Protestant Reformation.

=== Dioceses subordinate the Archdiocese of Nidaros ===
The Ancient Nidaros Diocese (1015 - 1152) covered North-Western and Northern Norway before the Archdiocese was established.

Metropolitan Archdiocese of Nidaros (at Trondheim)

The Archdiocese of Nidaros (1152 - 1537) headed an ecclesiastical province which included the following suffragan dioceses.

Map of ecclesiastical province of Nidaros (1153-1387)

Diocese	Territory	Cathedral	Founded
Archdiocese of Nidaros	Central and Northern Norway; Main cathedral and seat of the archbishop	Nidarosdomen	1152
Bjørgvin (earlier Selja)	Western Norway	Christ Church	1068
Oslo	Eastern Norway	St. Hallvards Cathedral	1068
Hamar	Inland of Eastern Norway	Ancient Hamar Cathedral	1152
Stavanger	South-Western and Southern Norway	Stavanger Cathedral	1125
Kirkjubøur	Faroe Islands	St. Magnus Cathedral	c. 1100
Kirkjuvagr	Orkney and Shetland	St. Magnus Cathedral	c. 1035
Suðreyjar	Isle of Man, Islands of the Clyde and the Hebrides	Peel Cathedral	1154
Skálholt	Southern Iceland	Skálholt Cathedral	1056
Hólar	Northern Iceland	Hólar Cathedral	1106
Garðar	Greenland	Gardar Cathedral	1124

=== Post-Reformation ===
Only direct precursors of the current sees.

== See also ==
- List of Catholic dioceses (structured view)
