= Cathedral Ruins in Hamar =

Cathedral remains in Norway

Coordinates: 60°47′31″N 11°02′18″E

For the current cathedral in Hamar, see Hamar cathedral.

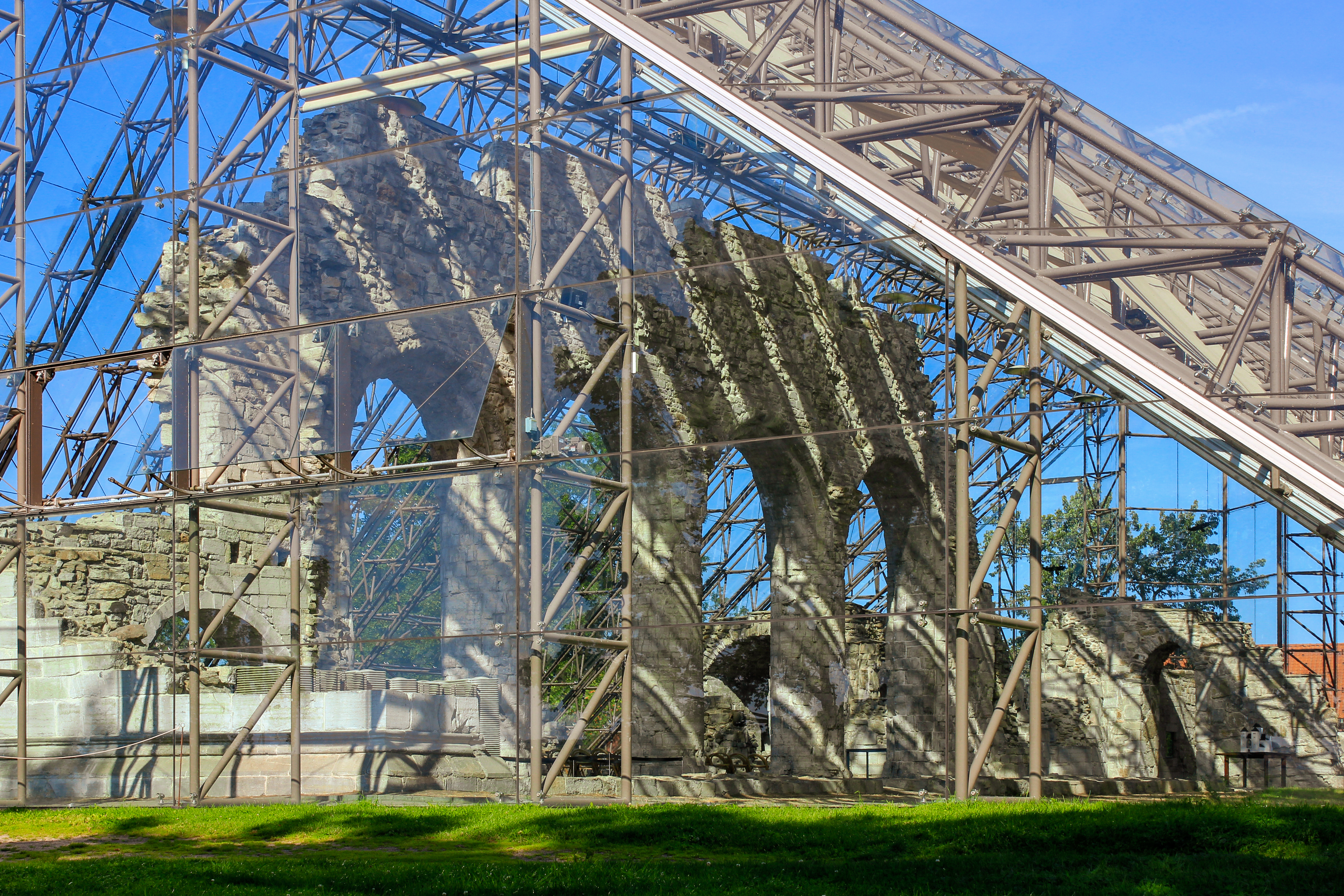
Hamar Cathedral ruins protected by a glass structure

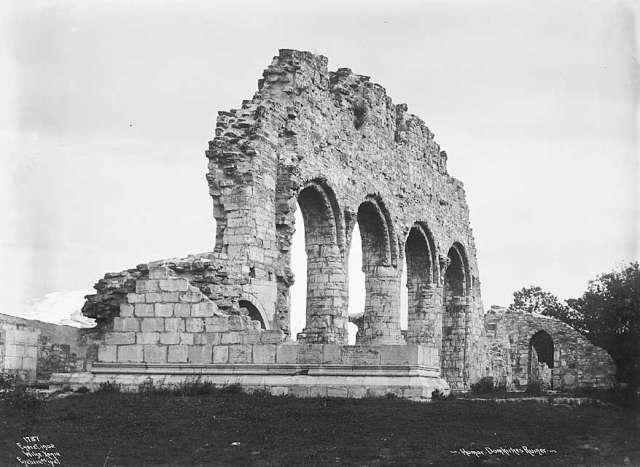
Photograph of the ruins, 1902

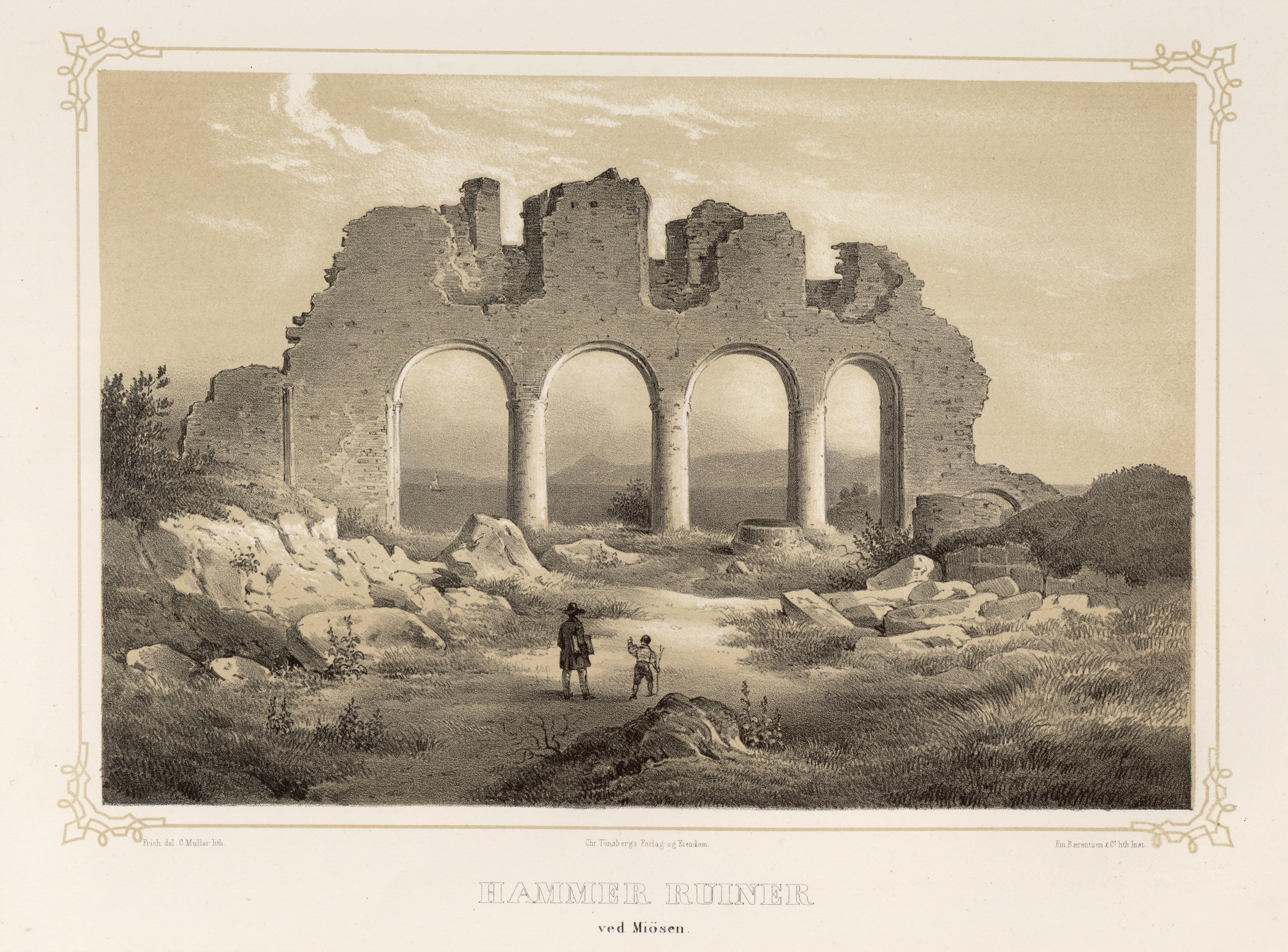
Drawing of the ruins by Joachim Frich, c. 1848

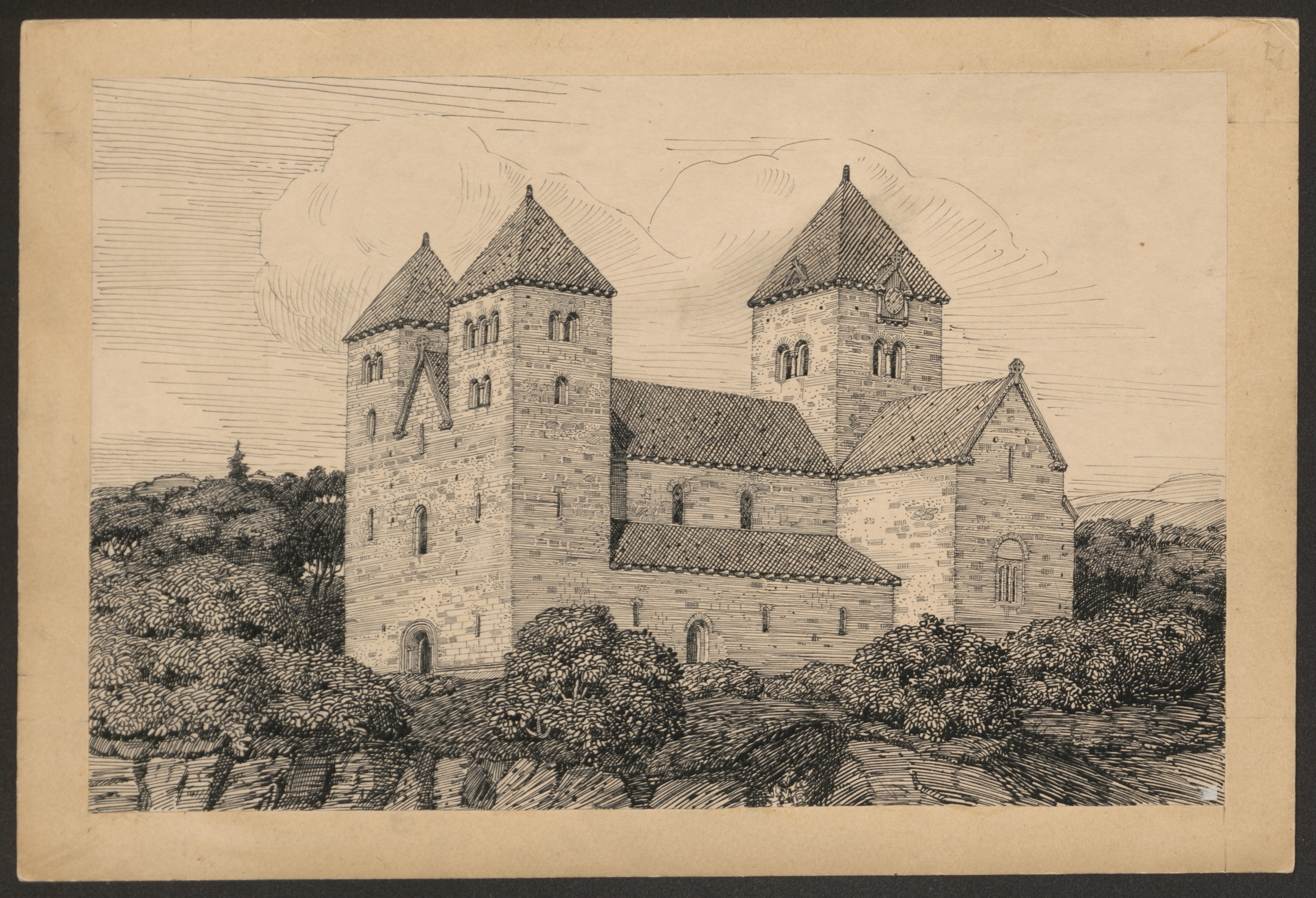
Hamar Cathedral, drawing by Olaf Nordhagen

Hamar Cathedral (Domkirkeruinene på Hamar) are the ruins of the medieval era Hamar Cathedral in Hamar, Norway

Hamar Cathedral was the see of the Ancient Diocese of Hamar. The diocese at Hamar had included much of the (modern) counties of Hedmark, Oppland, and Buskerud. The ruins form part of Anno Museum, formerly Hedmark museum, and were selected as the millennium site for Hedmark county.

== History ==
The cathedral's construction was begun by Bishop Arnaldur (1124–52), who was appointed first Bishop of Hamar in 1150 on his return from Gardar, Greenland. The cathedral was completed about the time of Bishop Paul (1232–52). It was originally built in the Romanesque architectural style and later converted to Gothic. Bishop Thorfinn of Hamar (1278–82) was exiled and died at Ter Doest in Flanders. Thorfinn and many other bishops of the area disagreed with King Eric II of Norway regarding a number of issues, including episcopal elections. Bishop Jörund (1285–86) was transferred to Trondheim.

In the aftermath of the Reformation in Norway, the structure was renamed Hamarhus and became the residence of the local sheriff. Although still used, the cathedral fell into disrepair, which culminated with its besiegement by the Swedish army and attempted demolition in 1567 during the Northern Seven Years' War. Swedish forces had launched attacks into Eastern Norway, capturing Hamar and continued towards Oslo. The Swedes later retreated, torching Hamar on their way, destroying Hamar Cathedral and Hamarhus.

Dating from 1987, construction started on the building of a protective structure to conserve the remains of the cathedral. Completed in 1998, the distinctive arches of the cathedral ruins are today protected by one of the most ambitious construction projects of its kind ever undertaken by the Norwegian government.

== Gallery ==
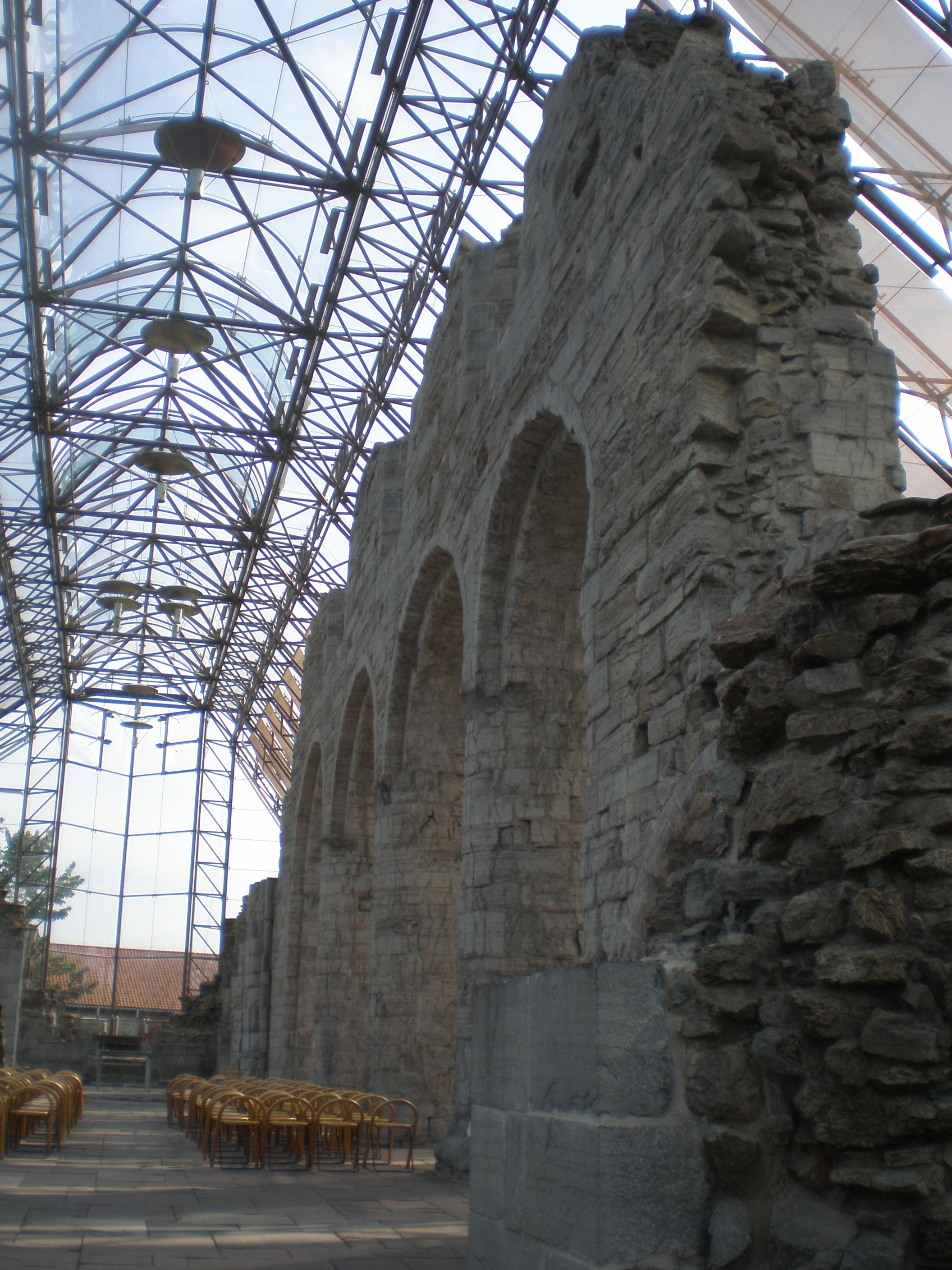
Arches in the cathedral ruins

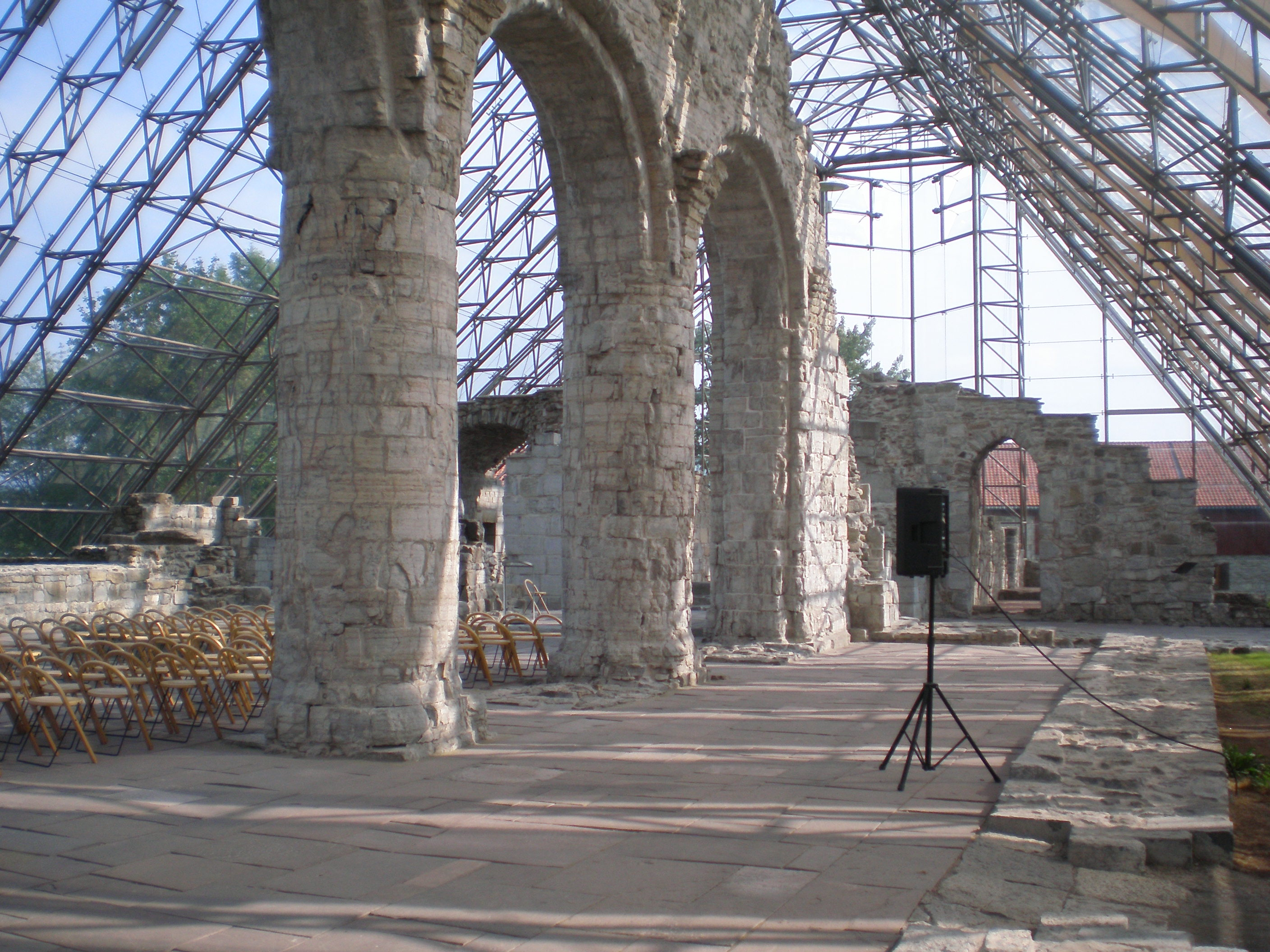
Arches in the cathedral ruins

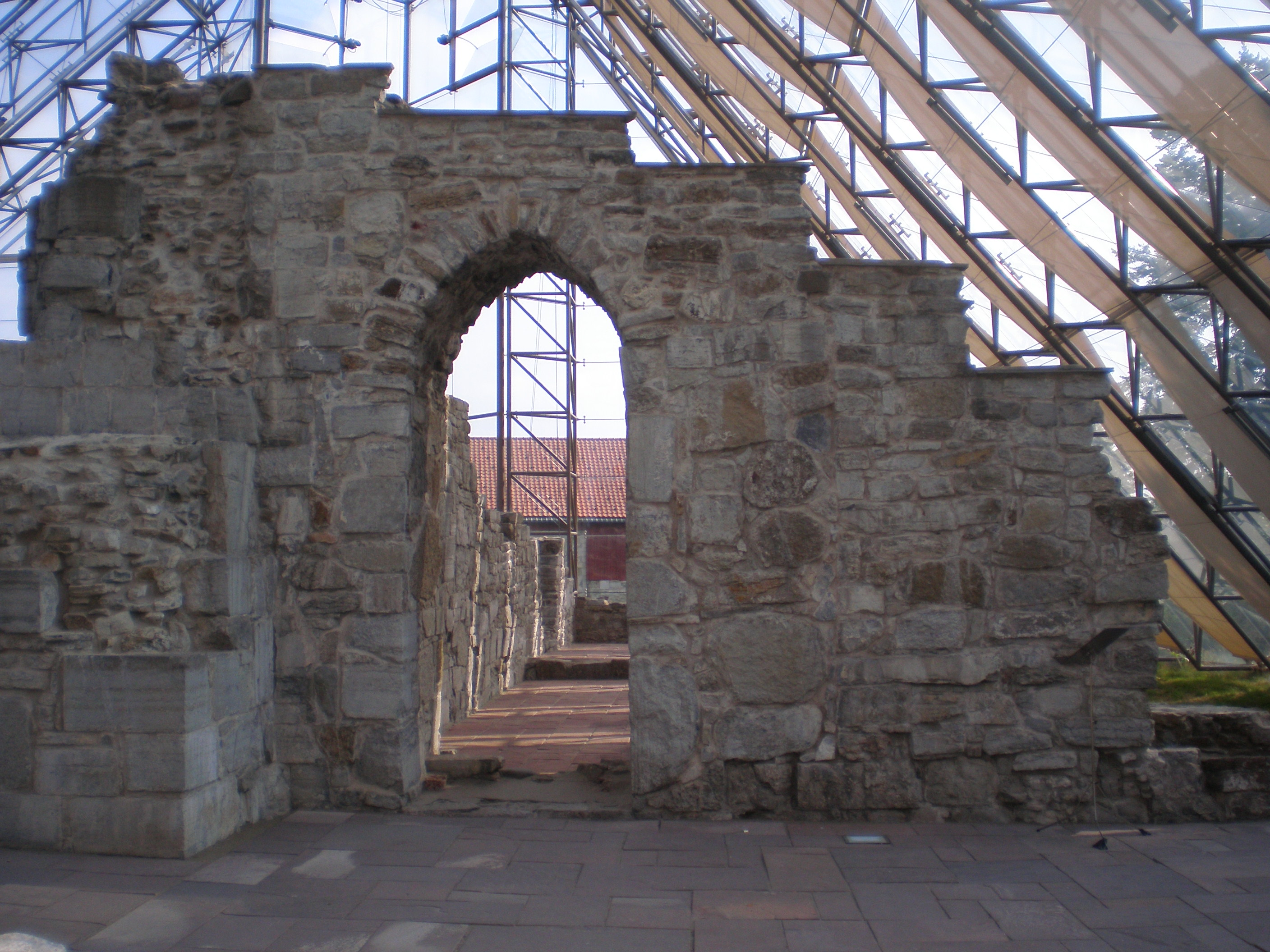
Arches in the cathedral ruins

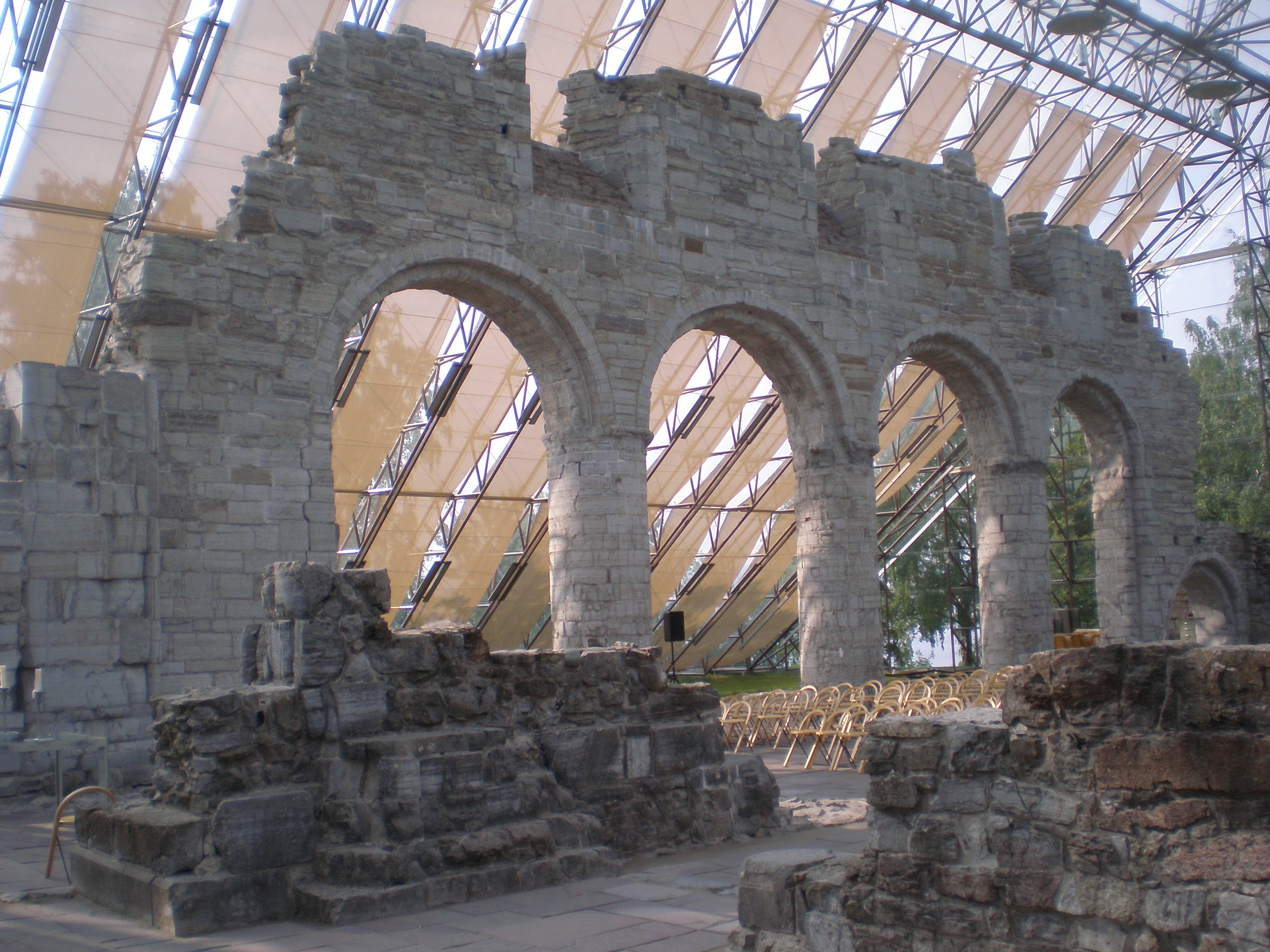
Arches in the cathedral ruins

== See also ==
- Hamarhus

== Other sources ==
- Gunnarsjaa, Arne (2006) Norges Arkitekturhistorie (Abstrakt forlag) ISBN 9788279351276
