= Norwegian Glacier Museum =

Museum in Fjærland, Norway

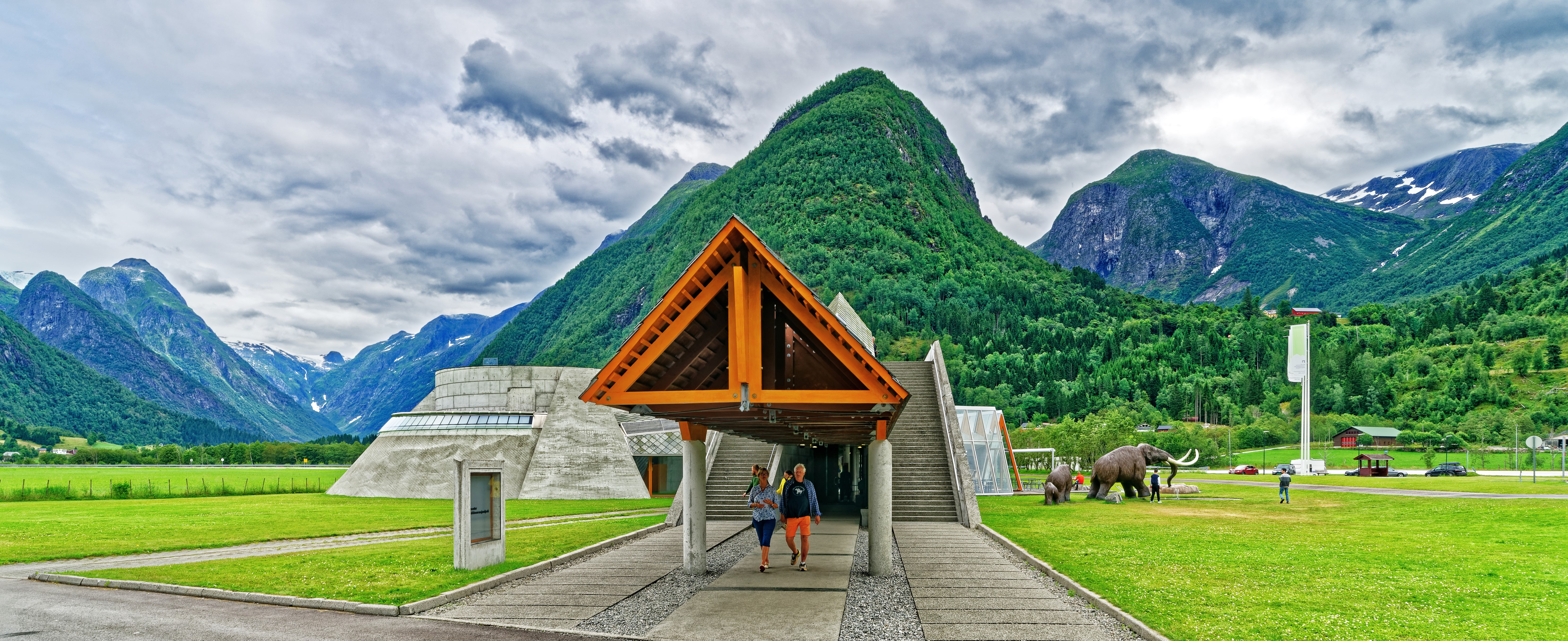

- Location within Norway
- Established: 2002
- Location: Fjærland, Vestland, Norway
- Coordinates: 61°25′24″N 6°45′46″E

The Norwegian Glacier Museum (Norwegian: Norsk Bremuseum) is a museum in Fjærland, Vestland county, Norway.

The building was designed by architect Sverre Fehn. In 2002 a decision was made to build an extension to the museum, which was also designed by Fehn. The museum also houses the Ulltveit-Moe Climate Centre, a Fehn-designed addition that opened in 2007.

The museum's stated purpose is to "collect, create and disseminate knowledge about glaciers and climate". It provides information about the glacier Jostedalsbreen and the Jostedalsbreen National Park. The museum is open from April through October, daily. It was founded as a joint project between the organizations and institutions Norwegian Trekking Association, the International Glaciological Society, the Norwegian Water Resources and Energy Directorate, the Norwegian Polar Institute, the Sogn og Fjordane University College, the University of Bergen and the University of Oslo.

In 2006 Sarner Ltd, a UK-based museum and attraction design company were commissioned to create an experiential exhibit on climate change. The exhibit Our Fragile Climate was opened in July 2007 by former US vice-president Walter Mondale.

Tour through the Norwegian Glacier Museum

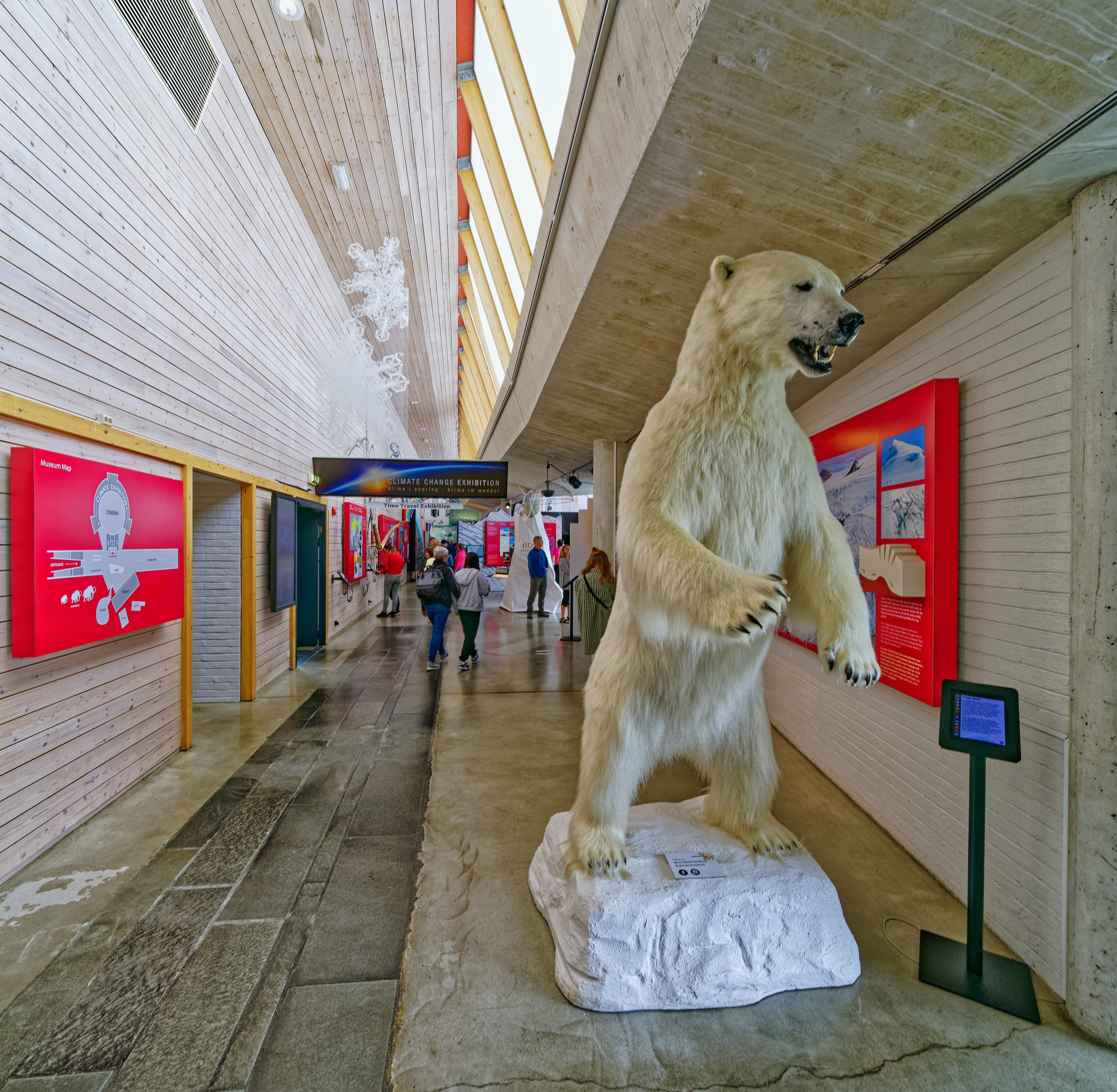

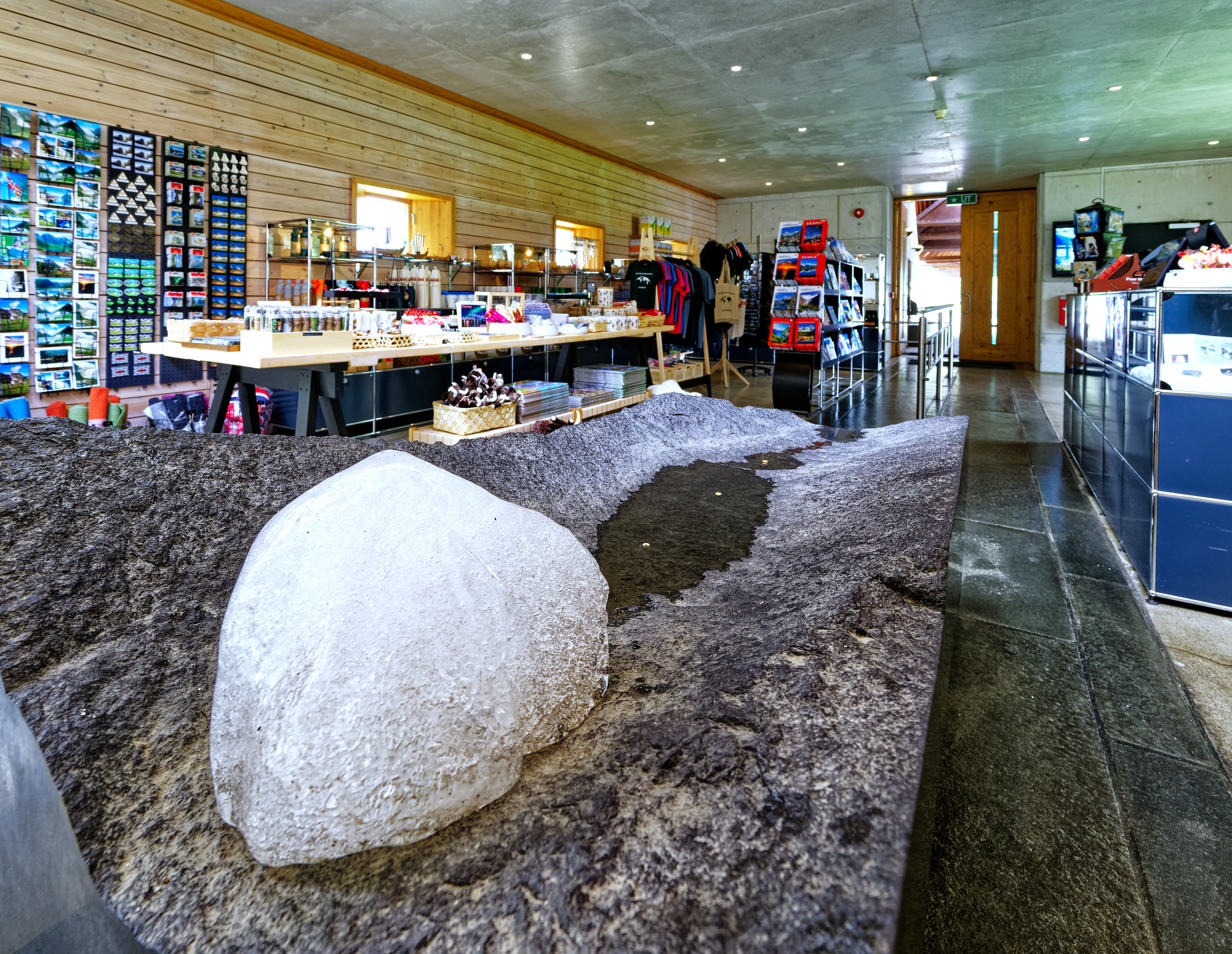

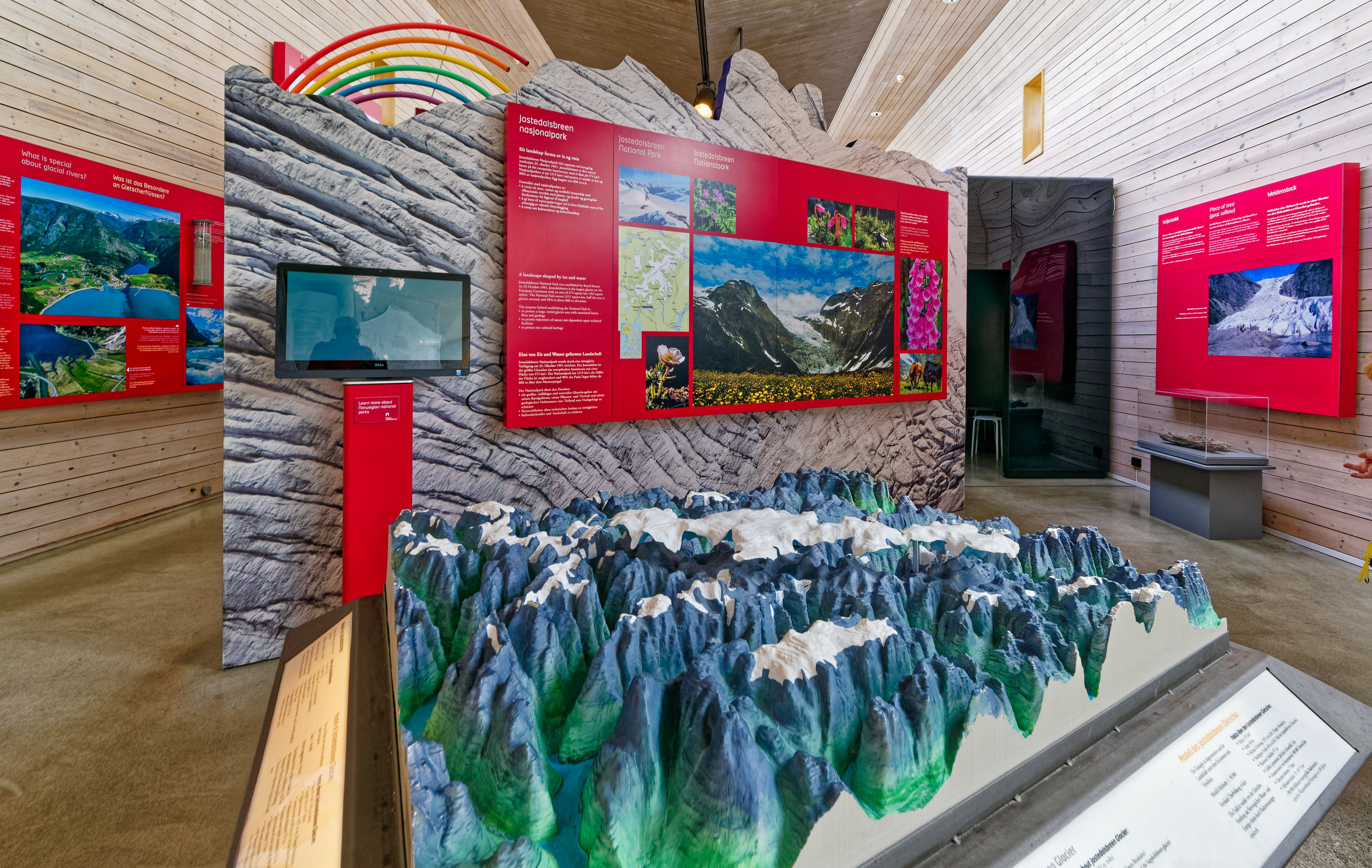

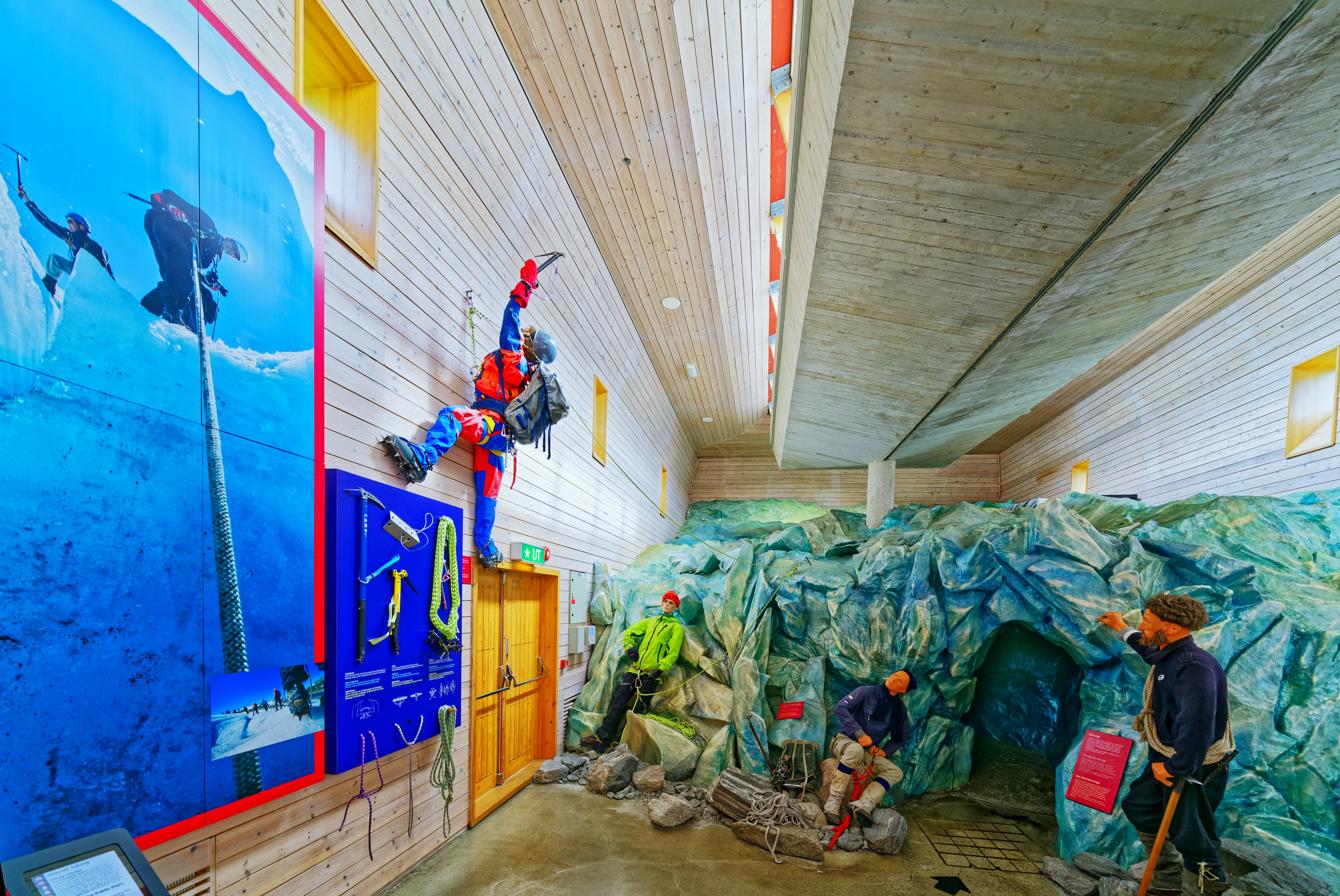

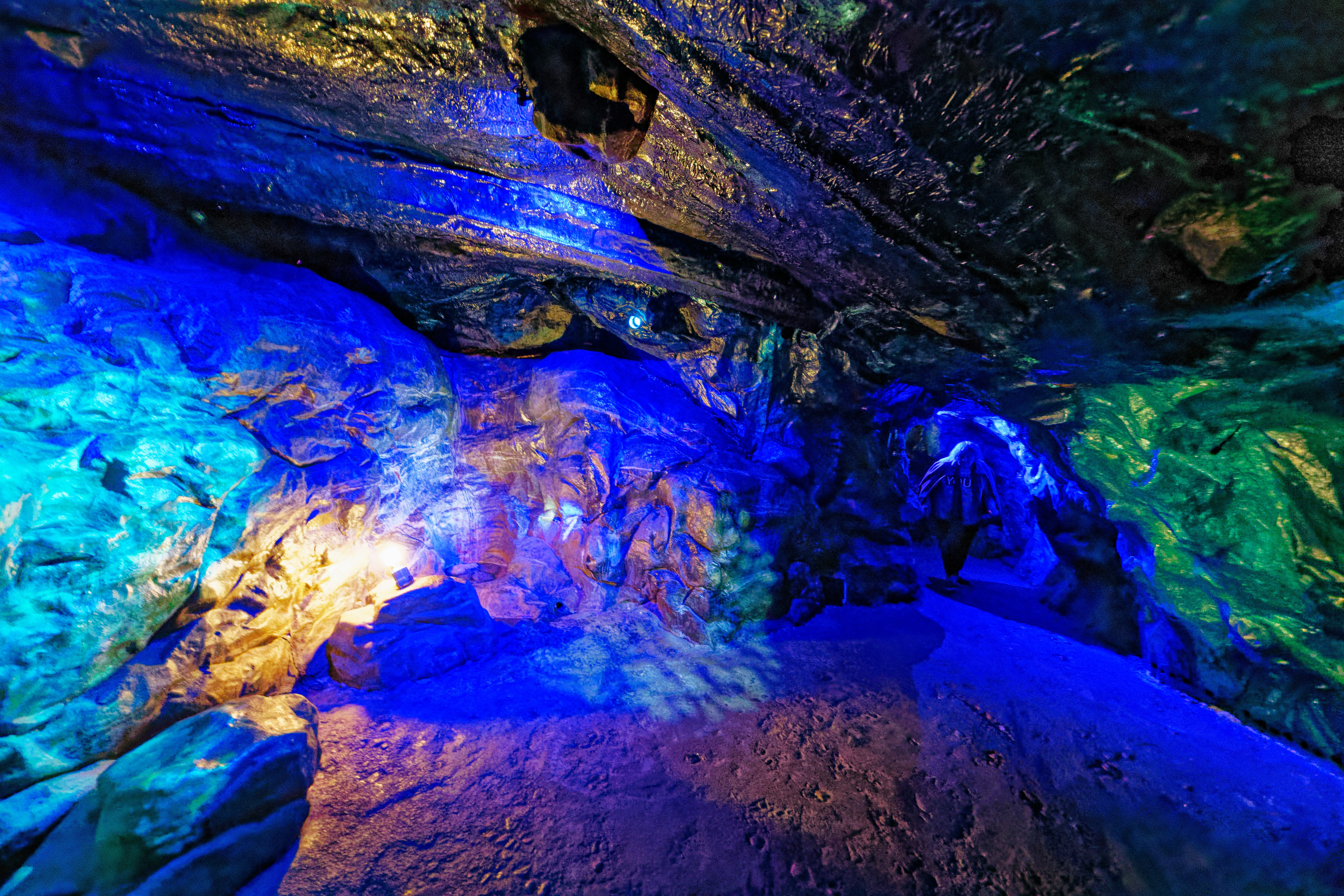
