= Grace Grung =

Norwegian actress (1895–1988)

- Born: December 2, 1895; Chicago, United States
- Died: November 14, 1988 (aged 92); Oslo, Norway
- Occupation: Actress
- Spouse: Leif Grung
- Children: Geir Grung

Hjørdis Grace Grung (née Lehmann, December 2, 1895 – November 14, 1988) was a Norwegian actress.

== Career ==
Grace Grung performed in two one-act plays for the Norwegian Broadcasting Company in 1925. Grung appeared in four film roles between 1931 and 1957. She made her film debut in Tancred Ibsen's Den store barnedåpen.

== Family ==
Grung was the daughter of the shopkeeper Harald Martin Lehmann (1863–1947) and his wife Inger (1871–?). In 1920 she married the architect Leif Grung (1894–1945), with whom she had a son, Geir Grung (1926–1989). She is not to be confused with Leif Grung's cousin, the actress Grace Elisabeth Grung (1889–1974).

== Filmography ==
- 1931: Den store barnedåpen
- 1942: Jeg drepte! as the surgery nurse
- 1950: To mistenkelige personer
- 1957: Slalåm under himmelen as the nurse
