= Sverre Fehn =

Norwegian architect

- Born: 14 August 1924; Kongsberg, Buskerud, Norway
- Died: 23 February 2009 (aged 84); Oslo, Norway
- Occupation: Architect
- Awards: Heinrich Tessenow Gold Medal; Pritzker Prize
- Buildings: Norwegian Glacier Museum

Sverre Fehn (14 August 1924 – 23 February 2009) was a Norwegian architect.

== Life ==
Fehn was born in Kongsberg in Buskerud, Norway. He was the son of John Tryggve Fehn (1894–1981) and Sigrid Johnsen (1895–1985). He received his architectural education at the Oslo School of Architecture and Design in Oslo. He entered his course of study in 1946 and graduated during 1949. Among other instructors, he studied under Arne Korsmo (1900–1968).

In 1949, Fehn and architect Geir Grung (1926–1989) won the competition for the Museum Building for the Sandvig Collections at Maihaugen in Lillehammer Municipality. In 1950, Fehn joined PAGON (Progressive Architects Group Oslo, Norway). The group, which was led by Arne Korsmo, had the goal of implementing and promoting modern architecture.

In 1952–1953, during travels in Morocco, he discovered vernacular architecture, which was to deeply influence his future work. Later he moved to Paris, where he worked for two years in the studio of Jean Prouvé and where he knew Le Corbusier. On his return to Norway in 1954, he opened a studio of his own in Oslo.

Sverre Fehn in 1954

At the age of 34, Fehn gained international recognition for his design of the Norwegian Pavilion at the 1958 Brussels World Exhibition. In the 1960s, he produced two works that have remained highlights in his career: the Nordic Pavilion at the Venice Biennale (1962) and the Hedmark Museum in Hamar (1967–79). Other notable works include the Norwegian Glacier Museum at Fjærland (1991–2002) and the National Museum of Art, Architecture and Design in Oslo (2003–08).

He was a professor at Oslo's School of Architecture from 1971 to 1995 and principal from 1986 to 1989. He additionally lectured throughout Europe, including at Paris, Stuttgart and Barcelona. He also lectured in the United States at the Cranbrook Academy of Art in Bloomfield Hills, Michigan, Cooper Union in New York City and Massachusetts Institute of Technology in Boston.

== Projects ==
Fehn designed over 100 buildings. Some of the most notable are:

- 1958 – Norwegian Pavilion at the Brussels World's Fair, Belgium
- 1962 – Nordic Pavilion at the Venice Biennale, Italy
- 1963 – Villa Schreiner, Oslo
- 1963-64 – Villa Norrköping, Sweden
- 1967 – Casa Bødtker House, Oslo
- 1967-79 – Hamarhus at Hedmark Museum in Hamar Municipality, Norway
- 1990 – Villa Busk, Bamble Municipality
- 1991-2002 – Norwegian Glacier Museum, Fjærland
- 1993-96 – Aukrust Centre in Alvdal Municipality
- 2000 – Ivar Aasen-tunet in Ørsta Municipality
- 2007 – Gyldendal House, Oslo
- 2003-08 – National Museum of Art, Architecture and Design, Oslo
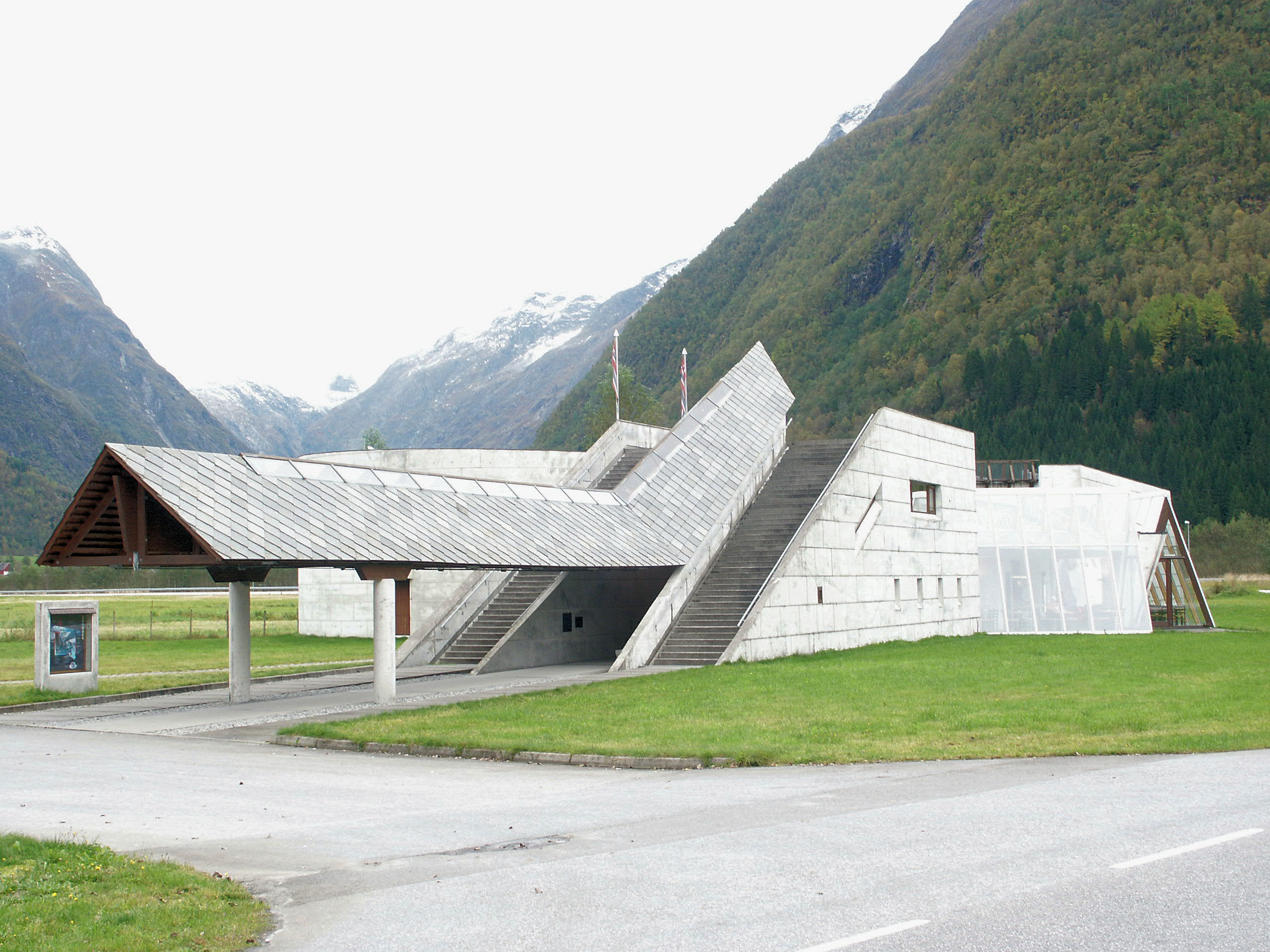
Norwegian Glacier Museum in Fjærland

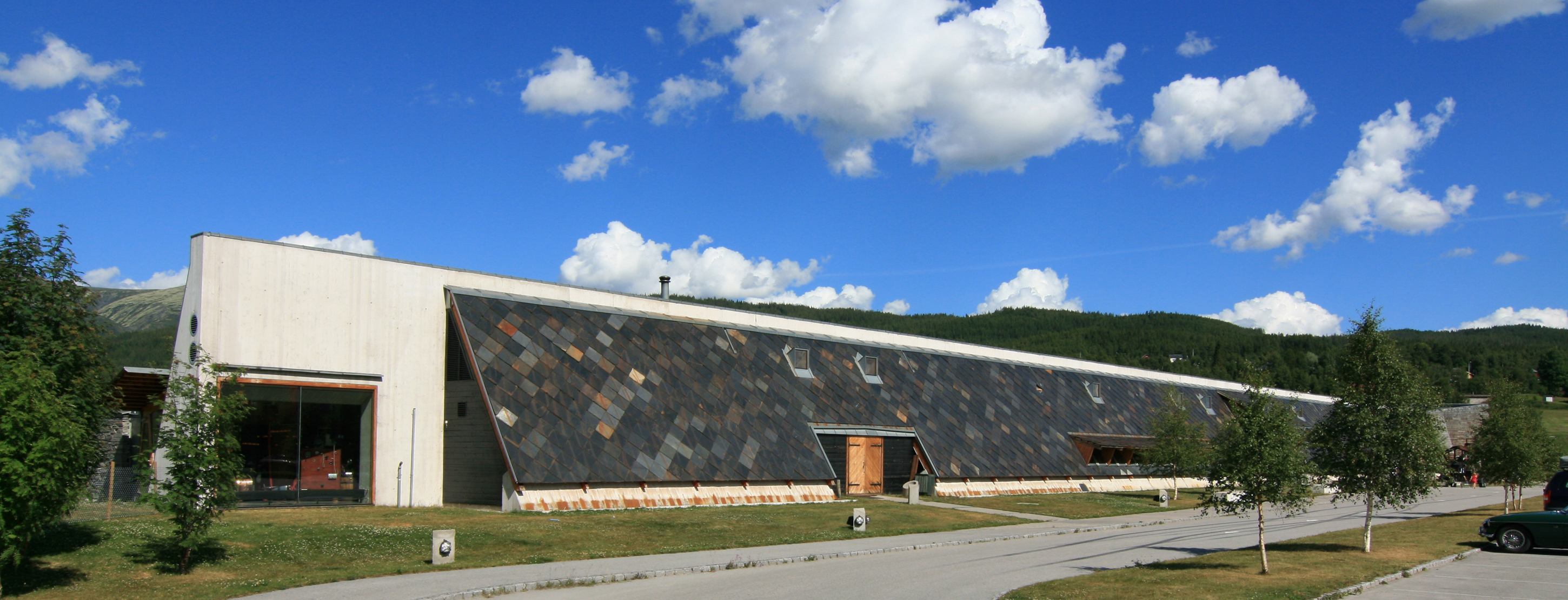
Aukrust Centre in Alvdal

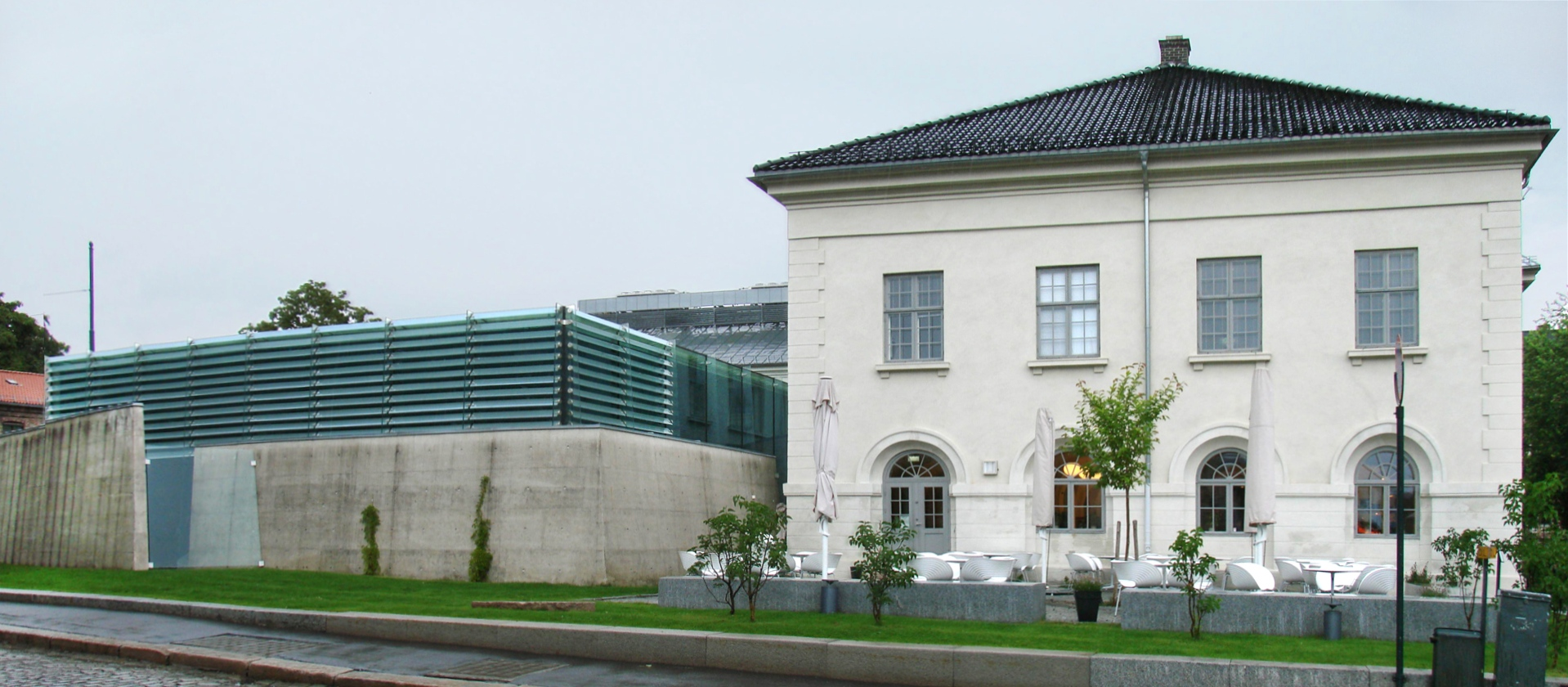
National Museum of Art, Architecture and Design

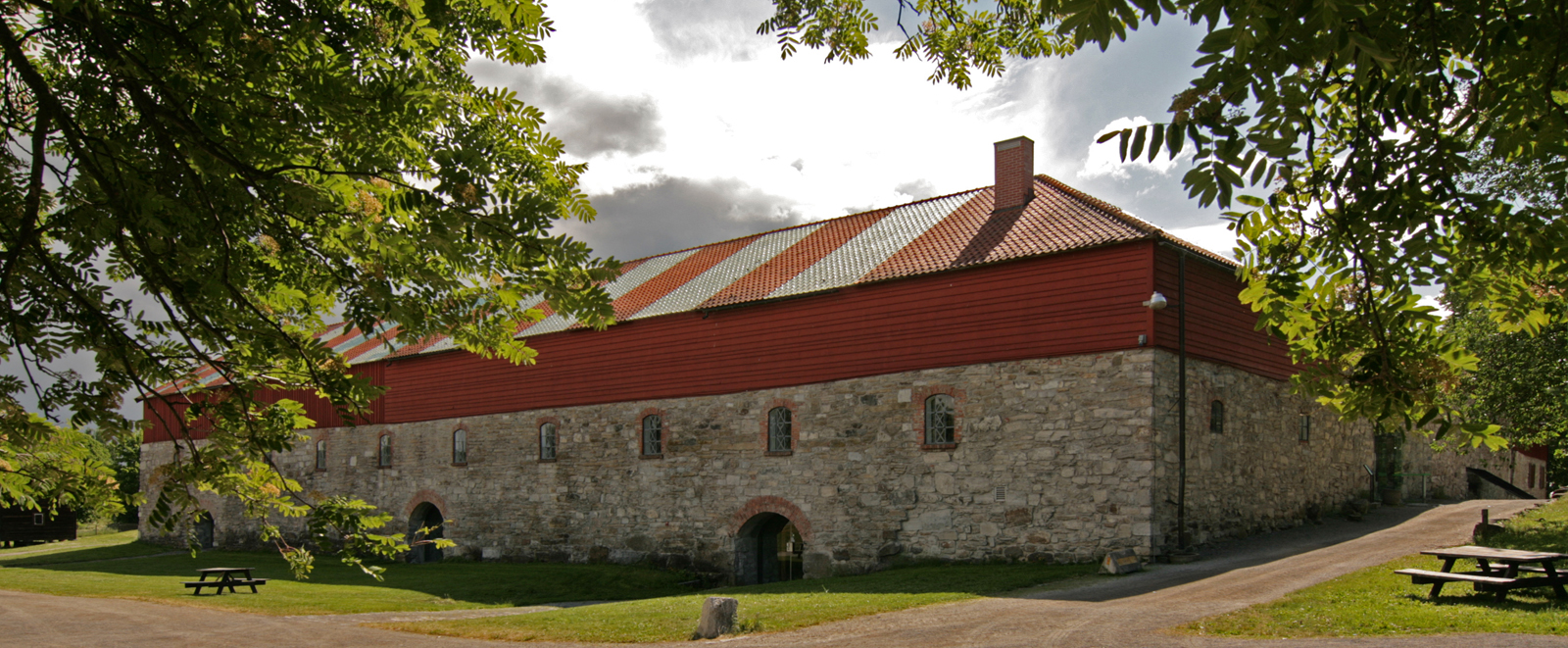
Storhamar barn at Hedmark

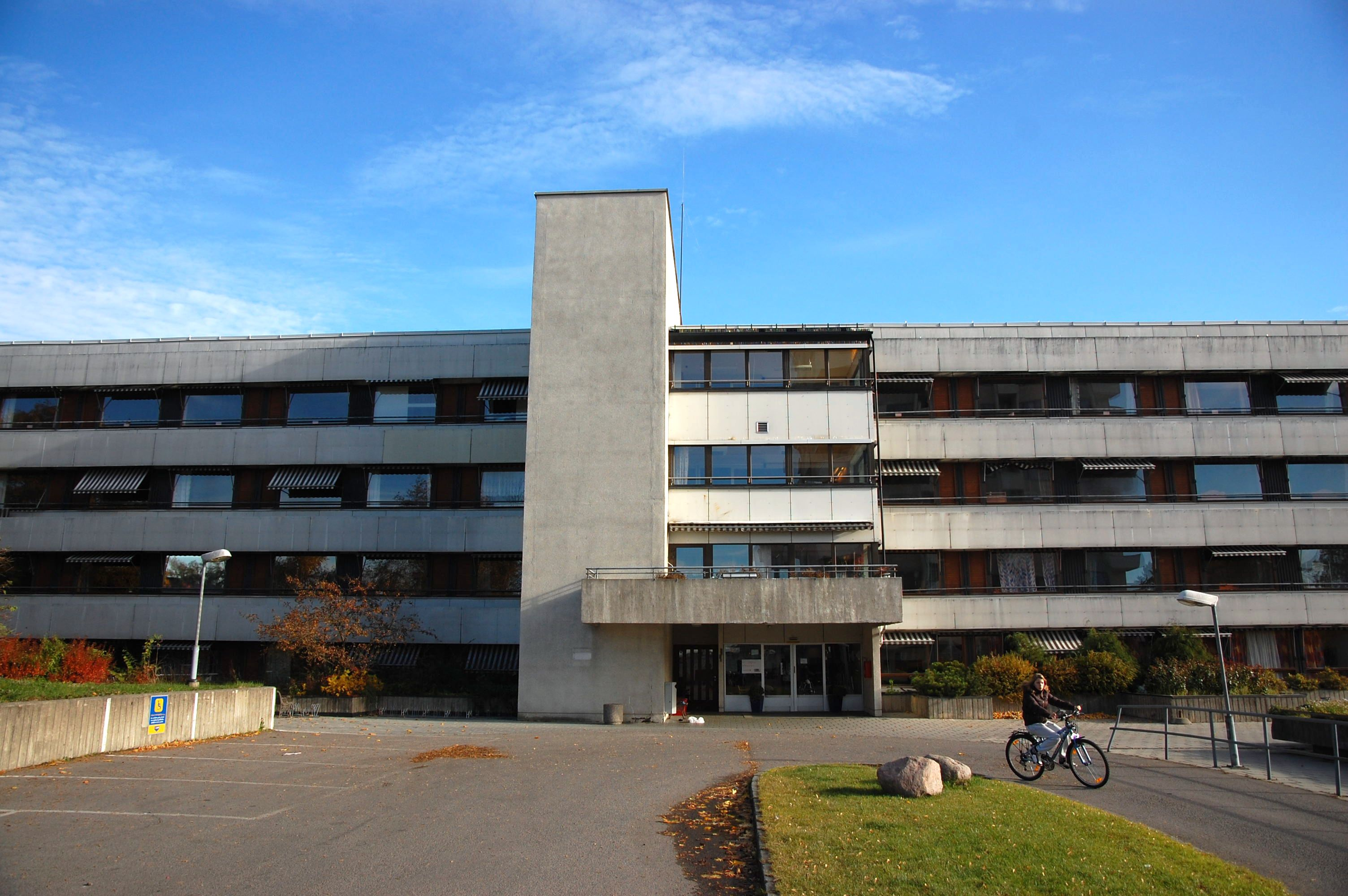
Økern Nursing Home in Oslo

== Awards ==
In 1961, he was awarded the Houen Foundation Award, jointly with Geir Grung, for the design of the Økern Nursing Home in Oslo. He received the Houen Foundation Award for his design of the Hedmark Museum at Hamar in 1975. In 1994 he was appointed Commander in the Order of St. Olav.

In 1998, he was awarded the Norsk kulturråds ærespris. In 2001, Sverre Fehn was awarded the first Grosch medal. In 2003, he was awarded the Anders Jahre Cultural Prize (Anders Jahres kulturpris).

His highest international honour came in 1997, when he was awarded both the Pritzker Architecture Prize and the Heinrich Tessenow Gold Medal (Heinrich-Tessenow-Medaille).

== Personal life ==
In 1952, he married Ingrid Løvberg Pettersen (1929–2005). Fehn died in his Oslo home at the age of 84. He was survived by his son Guy Fehn and four grandchildren.

== Other sources ==
- Olaf Fjeld (2009) Sverre Fehn: The Pattern of Thoughts (The Monacelli Press) ISBN 978-1580932172
- Gennaro Postiglione; Christian Norberg-Schulz (1997) Sverre Fehn (The Monacelli Press) ISBN 978-1885254641
- Per-Olaf Fjeld (1983) Sverre Fehn on the Thought of Construction (Rizzoli International) ISBN 978-0847804719

== Related reading ==
- The Secret of the Shadow: Light and Shadow in Architecture, 2002 with writings by Sverre Fehn
- Sverre Fehn, The poetry of the straight line =: Den rette linjes poesi, 1992
- Yukio Futagawa, Sverre Fehn. Glacier Museum. The Aukrust Centre, in "GA Document 56", 1998
- Sverre Fehn. Studio Holme, in "GA Houses 58", 1998

Awards
Preceded by Liv Ullmann	Recipient of the Norsk kulturråds ærespris 1998	Succeeded by Finn Carling
