= Anno Museum =

Group of museums in Innlandet, Norway

Coordinates: 60°47′33″N 11°02′24″E

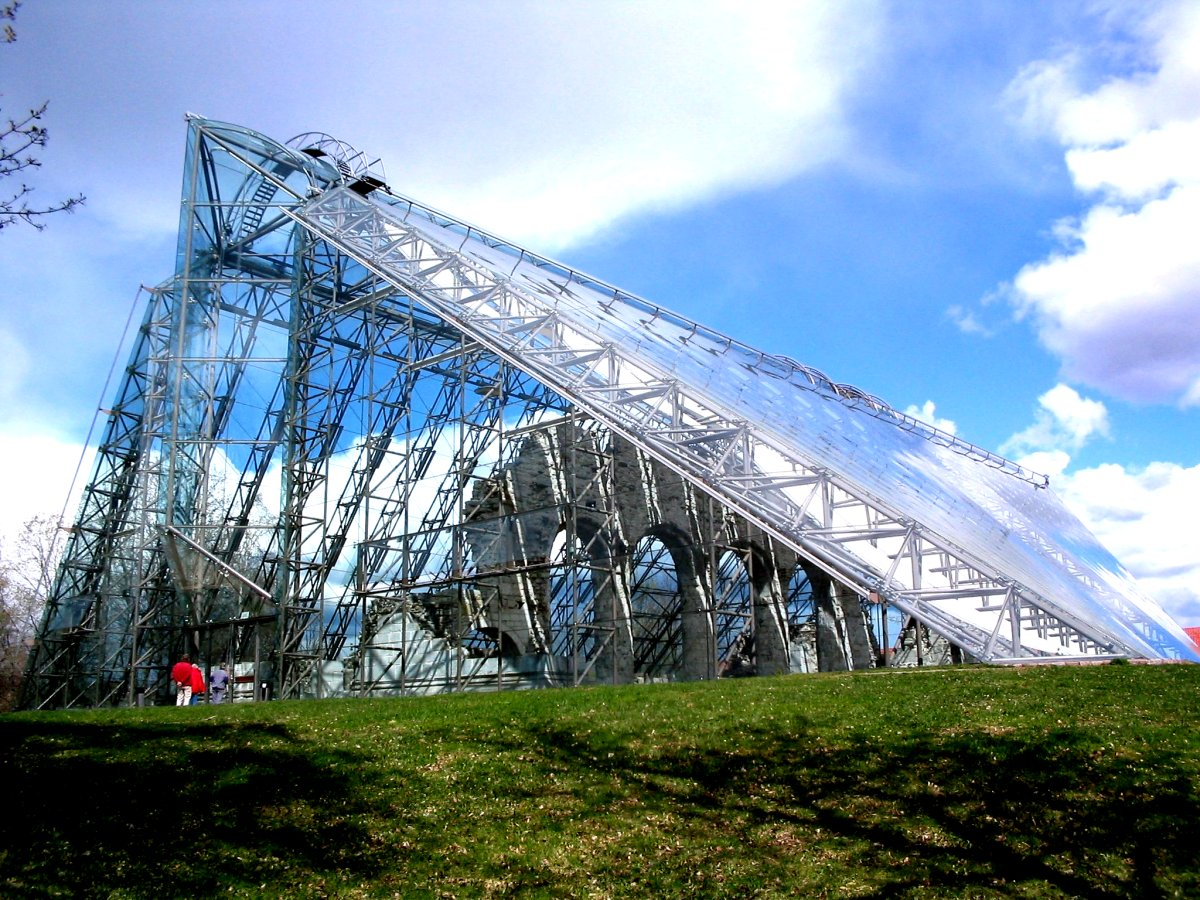
Cathedral ruins with protective shelter designed by Lund & Slaatto

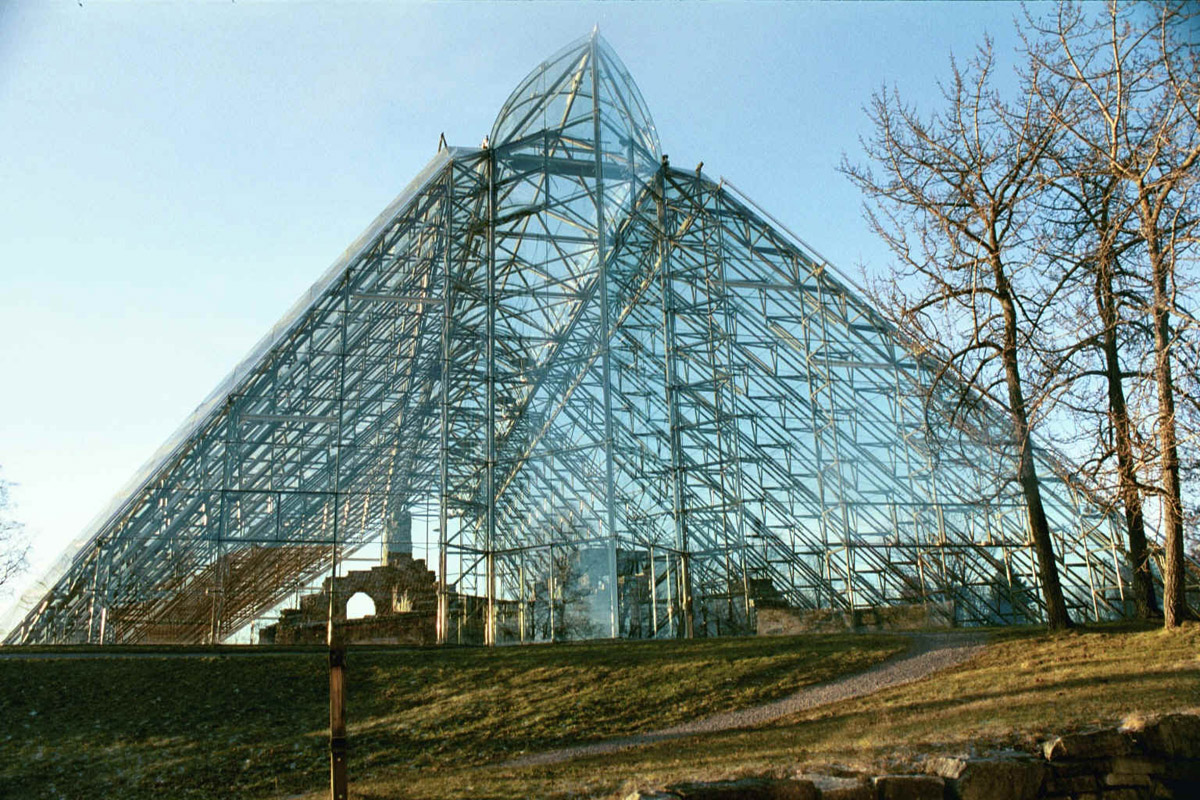
Cathedral ruins in Hamar

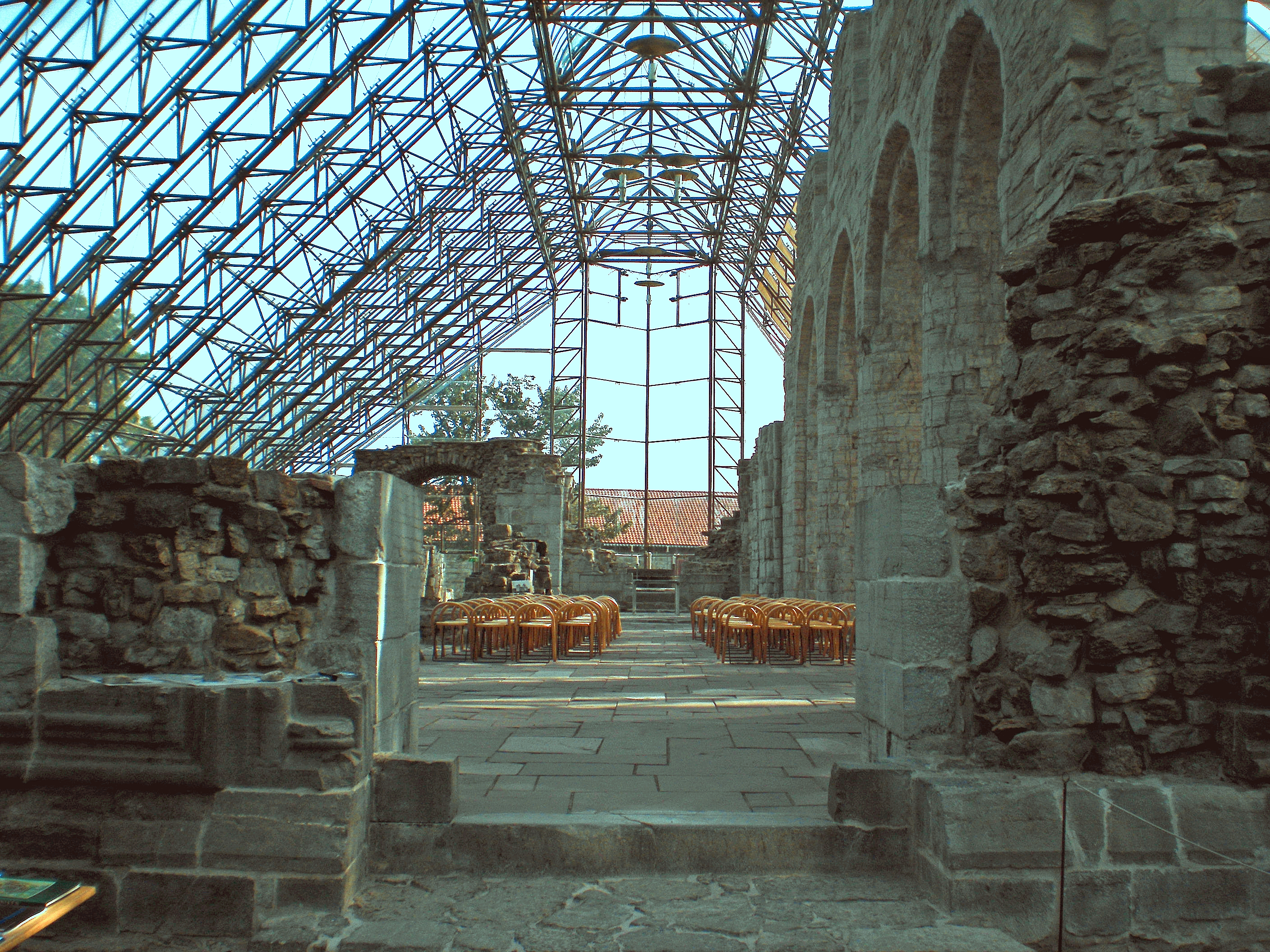
Right side of the Cathedral Ruins in Hamar

Anno Museum (formerly Hedmarks fylkesmuseum) in Hamar, Norway, is a regional museum for the municipalities of Stange, Hamar, Løten, and Ringsaker in central eastern Norway. It includes the medieval Cathedral Ruins in Hamar mentioned in Sigrid Undset's literary magnum opus Kristin Lavransdatter. The cathedral ruins are secured under a glass shelter designed by Lund & Slaatto Architects and completed in 1998.

The museum also consists of the cathedral gardens, folk museum and active herb garden featuring plants used during the Middle Ages. Additionally the museum houses one of the largest photography collections in Norway, covering the entire region of Hedemarken since photography was first introduced.

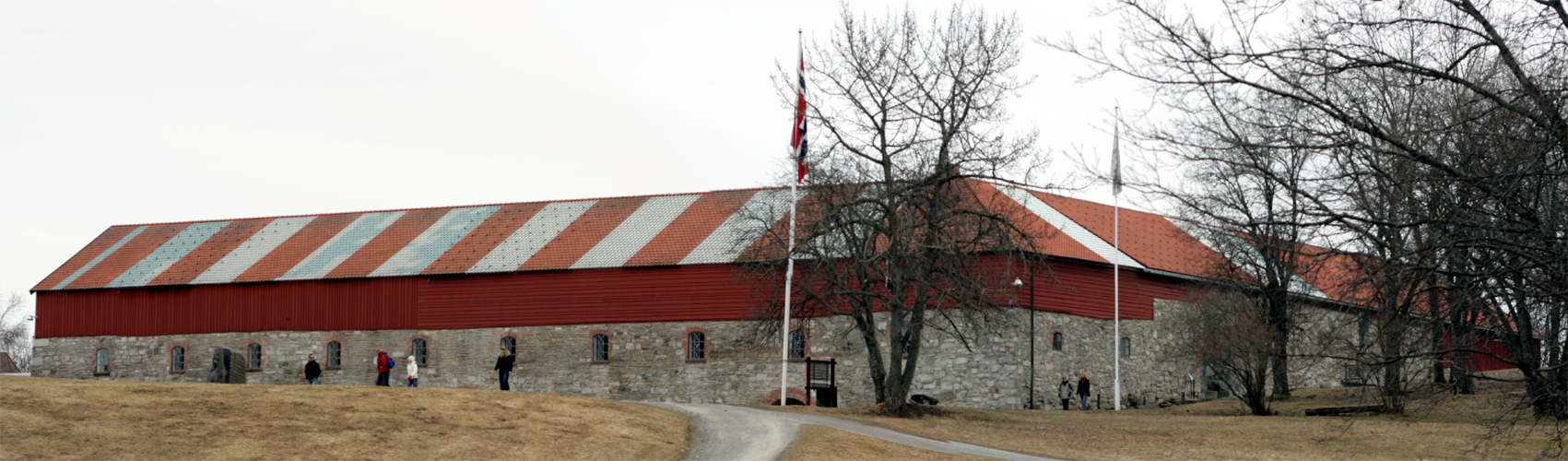
Storhamarlåven at Domkirkeodden

== Museum attractions ==
There are several noteworthy aspects to the museum:

- Its medieval section includes the ruins of a cathedral as well as remnants of a bishop's priory. The cathedral was originally constructed of locally quarried limestone in Romanesque architecture, although later additions were of Gothic architecture. The distinctive arches in the cathedral ruins are covered by a steel and glass structure designed by Lund & Slaatto and undertaken by the Norwegian government.
- The cathedral was never deconsecrated, and remains under the religious authority of the Roman Catholic Church - weddings can only be performed there with the permission of the church.
- Its ethnological museum provides a good sense of how people in the region lived from about the 16th century until the early 20th century. It includes buildings and courtyards collected from across the Hedemarken region, many of which have been restored to their original appearance. Among other noteworthy buildings, the collection includes one of the finest 19th century residential homes from the area.
- It is an active archeological site, and visitors can see the state of the dig at any given time. Most of the medieval town is as yet unexcavated, and visitors can visit the site in a field outside the confines of the museum.
- It is located in a beautiful recreational area along Lake Mjøsa. The recreational area is open to the public and includes a swimming area, gravel walkways, grass lawns, and a long shoreline.
- Storhamarlåven was designed by architect Sverre Fehn (1924–2009) in concrete, wood and glass to contrast with the stone of the medieval ruins. It was originally a barn built beside the ruins in the 17th century for the farm Storhamar. The architect sought to both highlight the original medieval structure and the more recent farm building. Its design won the Betongtavlen architectural award in 1976. Ramps provide the means to view the museum from above.

== Related reading ==
- Welle-Strand, Erling (1974) Museums in Norway (Oslo: Royal Ministry of Foreign Affairs) ISBN 8271770039
- Sæther, Tor (1995) Hamar i middelalderen (Hedmarksmuseet og Domkirkeodden) ISBN 978-8291326023
