= Grace Elisabeth Grung =

Norwegian actress (1889–1974)

- Born: May 5, 1889; Bergen, Norway
- Died: February 4, 1974 (aged 84); Oslo, Norway
- Occupation: Actress

Grace Elisabeth Grung (May 5, 1889 – February 4, 1974) was a Norwegian actress.

== Family ==
Grace Elisabeth Grung was the daughter of Arnt Henrik Grung (1859–1924), an office manager at a steamship shipping company, and Grace Elisabeth Simonsen (1855–1899). She was unmarried. She was a cousin of the architect Leif Grung, not to be confused with his wife, the actress Grace Grung.

== Career ==
Grace Elisabeth Grung debuted at the National Theater in 1909 and was intermittently engaged with that theater until the summer of 1919. She then toured with Agnes Mowinckel's ensemble and performed with the experimental Intimate Theater (Norwegian: Intimteatret). She was at the Trondheim National Theater from 1923 to 1925, took part in Hans Bille's tour in 1929, performed at the Carl Johan Theater from 1932 to 1933, and was engaged with the New Theater from 1933 to 1957.
