= Thorfinn of Hamar =

Norwegian bishop and saint (died 1285)

Saint Thorfinn of Hamar

Bishop
- Born: unknown
- Died: 1285
- Venerated in: Catholic Church
- Canonized: 1345
- Feast: 8 January

Thorfinn of Hamar (died 1285) was the Bishop of the Ancient Diocese of Hamar in medieval Norway.

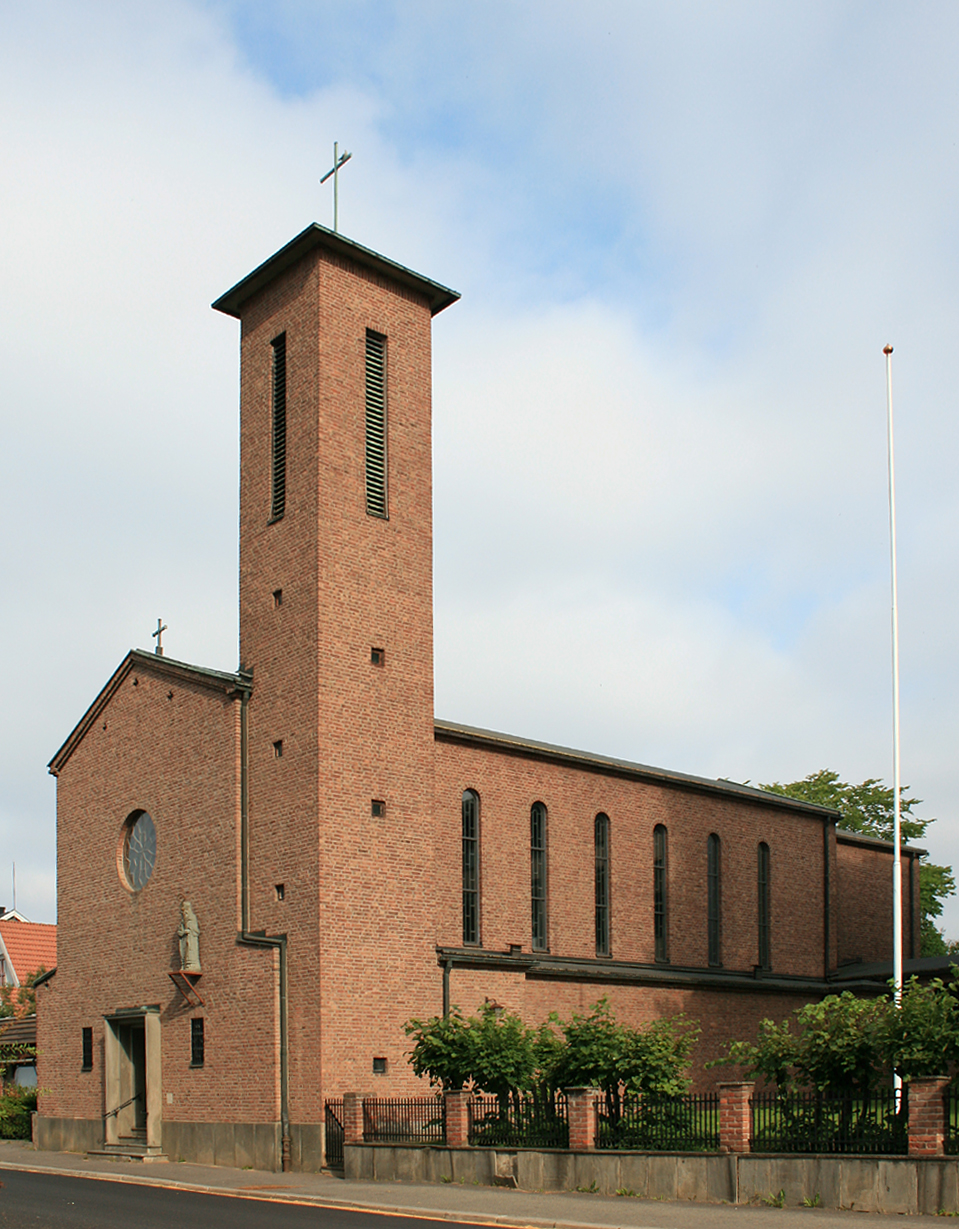
St. Torfinn Catholic Church in Hamar

== Biography ==
Thorfinn was born in Trøndelag, possibly in Trondheim, Norway, and may have been a Cistercian monk before becoming Bishop of Hamar. Although he achieved a fair amount of fame as a saint, comparatively few details of his life are clearly known.

Thorfinn and many other bishops of the area disagreed with the sitting King Eric II of Norway regarding a number of issues, including episcopal elections. King Erik received the nickname "Priesthater" from his less than successful relations with the church.

There had been an agreement, the Tønsberg Concord (Sættargjerden in Tønsberg) signed in 1277 between King Magnus VI of Norway and Jon Raude, the Archbishop of Nidaros confirming certain privileges of the clergy, the freedom of episcopal elections and similar matters. In 1282, King Eric repudiated this agreement, and a fierce dispute between Church and state ensued. Eventually the King outlawed Archbishop Jon Raude, and his two chief supporters, Bishop Andres of Oslo and Bishop Thorfinn of Hamar. Bishop Thorfinn, after many hardships including shipwreck, made his way to the abbey of Ter Doest (Abdij Ter Doest) at Lissewege, near Bruges, in the Flemish Region of Belgium. Torfinn died there on January 8, 1285 and was buried near the altar of the abbey church. The remains of Torfinn were later reinterred at a convent in Bruges during 1687.

Walter de Muda, one of the monks at Ter Doest at the time, wrote a poem in Latin praising the character of Thorfinn. Father Walter remembered Bishop Thorfinn staying in the monastery and the impression he had made of gentle goodness combined with strength. His mild exterior covered a firm will against whatever he esteemed to be evil and ungodly. Father Walter had written the poem about him after his death and hung it up over his tomb.

== In literature ==
St. Thorfinn appears in The Axe, the first volume of Sigrid Undset's The Master of Hestviken. There he is depicted as the kindly and compassionate Bishop of Hamar, who makes great efforts to help the book's young lovers, denied the right to marry by malicious relatives.

== Other sources ==
- Attwater, Donald and Catherine Rachel John. The Penguin Dictionary of Saints. 3rd edition. New York: Penguin Books, 1993. ISBN 0-14-051312-4.
