= Leif Grung =

Norwegian architect (1894–1945)

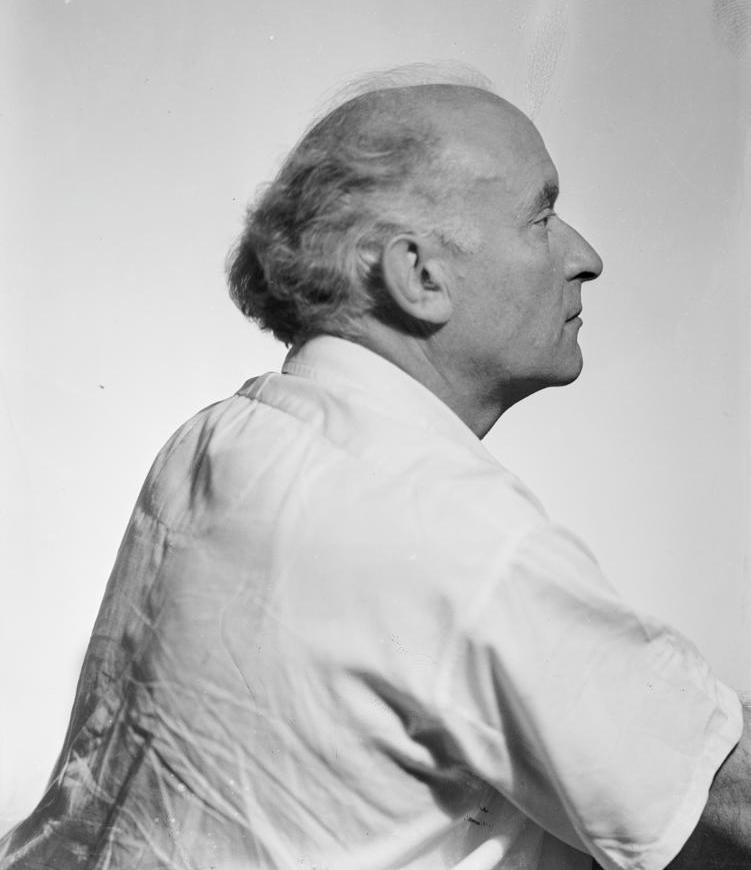
- Born: 27 December 1894
- Died: 2 October 1945 (aged 50)

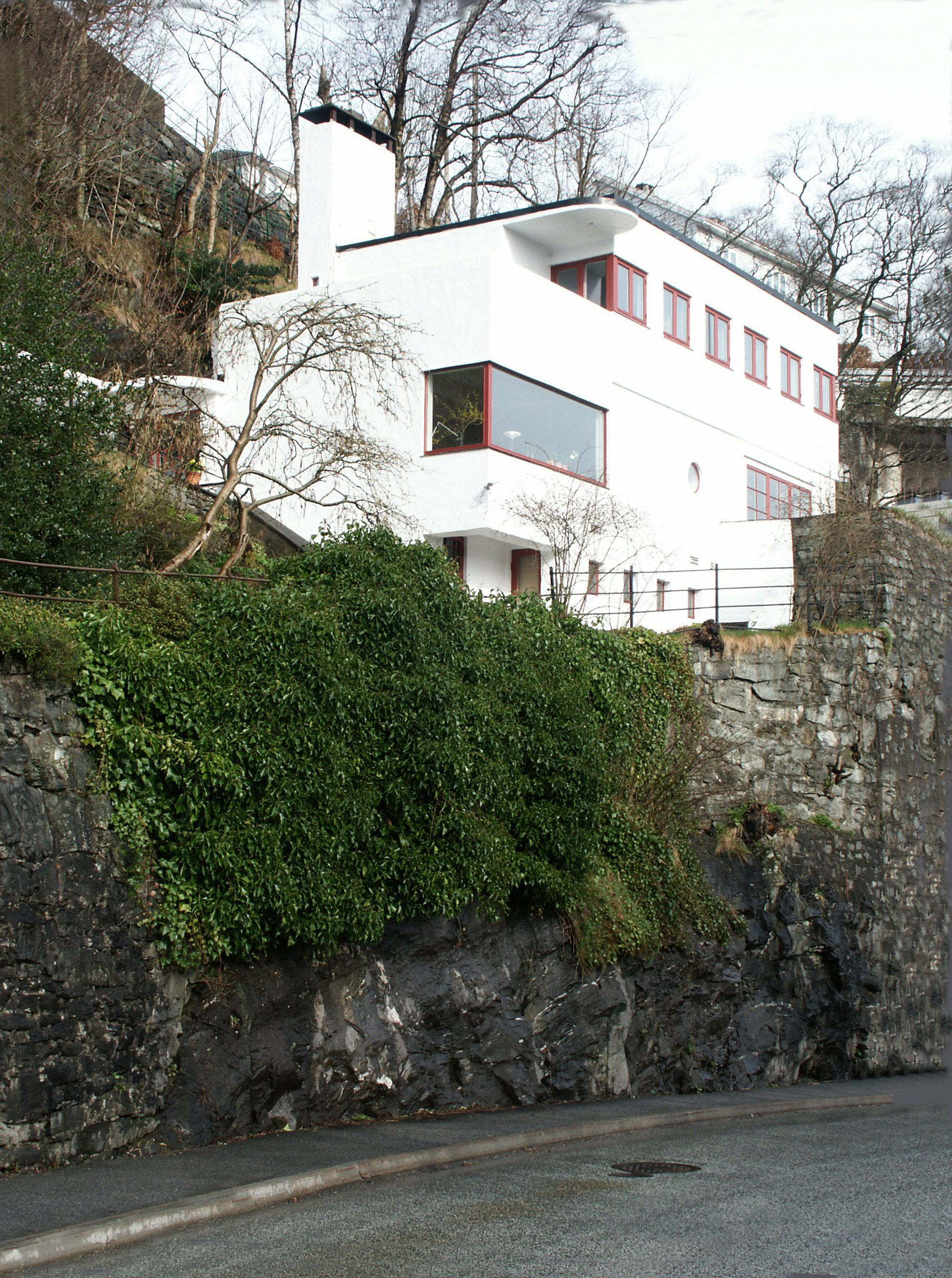
Villa Lau-Eide, Functionalism. Ole Irgens vei 126, Bergen

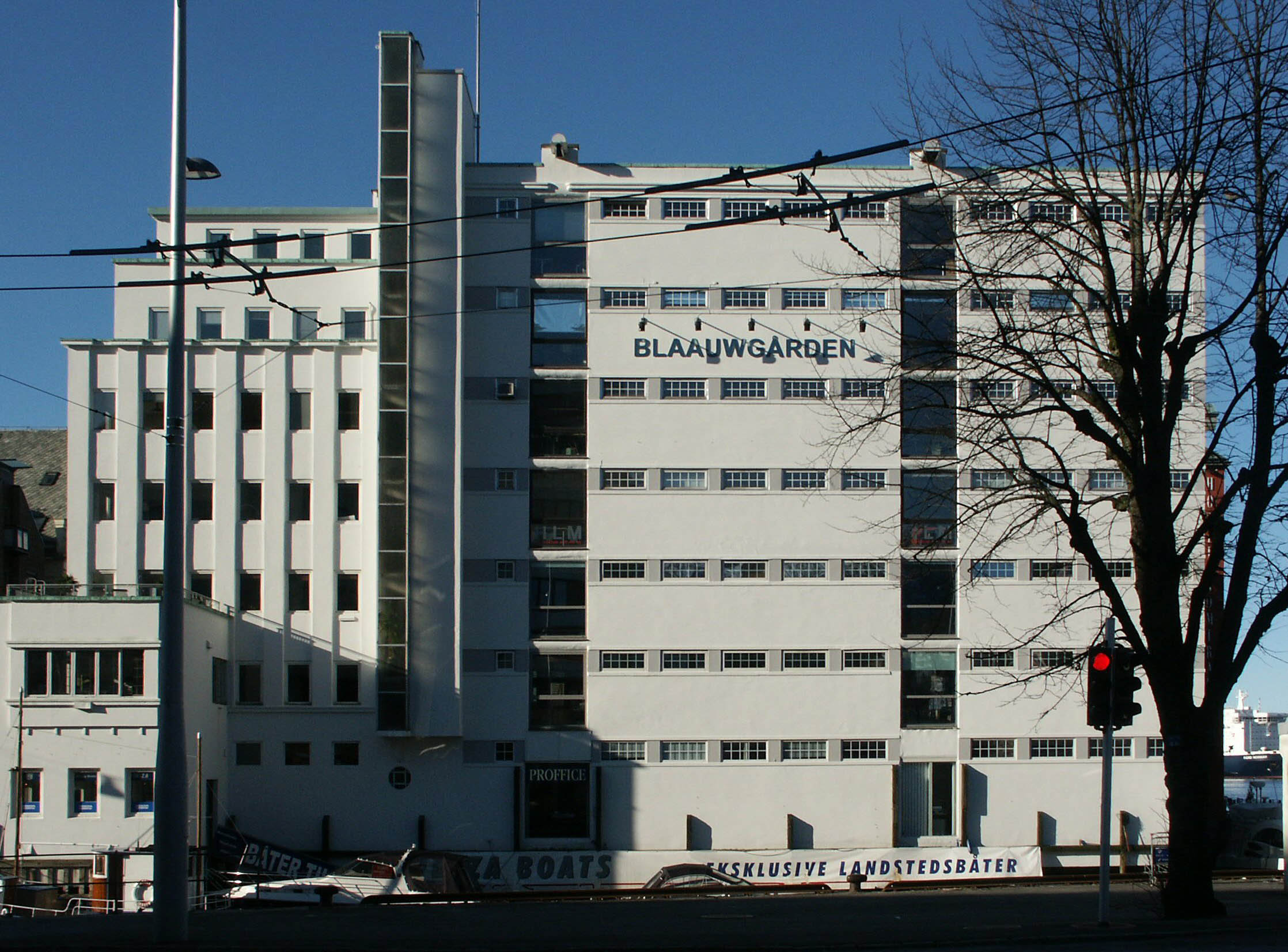
Blaauwgården, C. Sundts gate 1, Bergen. Originally office- and storehouse. Today the part facing the harbour is fitted out for offices.

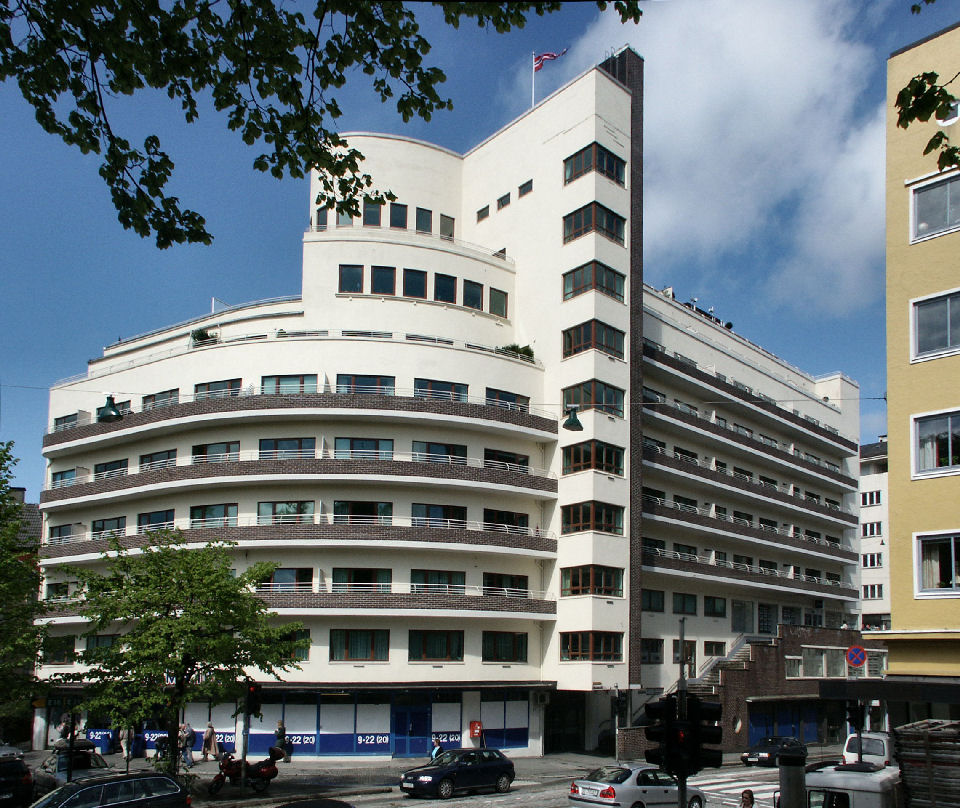
Kalmarhuset, Functionalism. Jon Smørs gate 11, Bergen

Leif Kuhnle Grung (27 December 1894 – 2 October 1945) was a Norwegian architect. He was among the leading architects in Bergen during the 1920s and 1930s.

== Background ==
Leif Grung was born in Bergen. He was from a family of Norwegian architects. His father was an architect, Georg H. Grung (1861–1932). His son was Geir Grung (1926–1989). Leif Grung was a cousin of the theater actress Grace Elisabeth Grung, not to be confused with his wife, Grace Grung.

Leif Grung was educated in Stockholm where he studied architecture at the KTH Royal Institute of Technology and graduated in 1920. He established his own architectural studio in Bergen during 1923. Grung went on to become one of the foremost pioneers for functionalism in Bergen.

== Career ==
Leif Grung was a versatile architect marked by distinctive artistic nerve. He was open to international ideas and was inspired by both the Bauhaus school and by Frank Lloyd Wright. He also committed himself to the self-builder movement, to modernizing onshore communications and expanding the road system surrounding Bergen.

In the end of the 1920s, he became a standard-bearer for the functionalist movement in Bergen. As such, he often met heavy resistance, even from his colleagues. Nevertheless, he was widely respected, enjoying high standing and popularity. Eventually he became the most productive architect in Bergen in the 1930s.

Grung designed both Kalmarhuset and Blaauwgården in Bergen. He also designed villas in the Tveiteås-area and Fjellveien/Starefossen-area. He also designed residential houses at Jægers minde, at Årstad and Langhaugen among others. Leif Grung designed a number of industry and store houses during his career, but the most “functional” of all his designs was Statens kornsilo at Vaksdal Mølle.

After the end of the occupation of Norway by Nazi Germany, he was accused of collaboration with the German occupation authorities and was expelled from the Bergen Architects Association. This led to his taking his own life. Just a few days after his suicide, the first prisoners of war from Germany returned home. These first witnesses confirmed that during World War II, Grung had been an intermediary for the escape route across the North Sea to Great Britain and had sabotaged German building plans. In 1949, four years after his death, he was awarded the Houen Foundation Award for outstanding, independent and completed architectural works in connection with Blaauwgården.

== Selected works in Bergen ==
- Mowinckel-gården, Olav Kyrres gate 9, (1924–25)
- Fridalens bungalow-bebyggelse, (1927–30)
- Statens kornsilo at Vaksdal Mølle, (1930)
- Jægers Minde, villaer, Hegreneset, (1930–37)
- villabebyggelse på Tveiteråsen, (1933–39)
- Blaauwgården, C. Sundts gate 1, (1936)
- Kalmarhuset, Jon Smørs gate 11, (1936)
- Bygård Fortunen ved Tårnplass, (1938).
