= Ancient Diocese of Hamar =

Roman Catholic diocese in Norway (1152 - 1542)

Diocese of Hamar Dioecesis Hamar Bispedømme Hamar
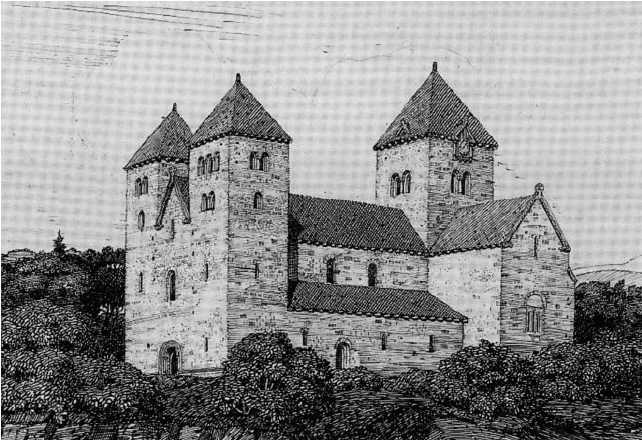
- The old cathedral of Hamar

Location
- Country: Norway
- Ecclesiastical province: Niðaros
- Metropolitan: Niðaros
- Coordinates: 60°47′31″N 11°02′18″E

Information
- Denomination: Roman Catholic
- Sui iuris church: Latin Church
- Rite: Roman Rite
- Established: 1153
- Cathedral: Old Cathedral of Hamar

The former Norwegian Catholic diocese of Hamar existed from 1152 to 1542, when the Protestant Reformation turned it into a bishopric of the Lutheran state church. The cathedral see was at Hamar, and the diocese included the (modern) counties of Hedmark (except Solør, Odalen and the northern part of Østerdalen), Oppland (except Valdres), and the middle part of Buskerud (the traditional districts Numedal and Ringerike). It also included some parts of Telemark (the modern municipalities of Hjartdal, Notodden, Seljord, Tinn and Vinje).

== History ==
It was formed in 1152 out of the diocese of Oslo, when Arnold, Bishop of Garðar, Greenland (1124–1152), was appointed first Bishop of Hamar. He began to build the now ruined cathedral of Christ Church, which was completed about the time of Bishop Paul (1232–1252).

Bishop Thorfinn (1278–1282) was exiled and died at Ter Doest Cistercian Abbey in Lissewege, Flanders. Bishop Jörund (1285–1286) was transferred to the archdiocese of Trondhjem. A provincial council was held in 1380.

The last Catholic bishop, Mogens Lauritssøn (1513–1537), was taken prisoner in his castle at Hamar by Truid Ulfstand, a Danish noble, and sent to Antvorskov in Denmark, where he was held until his death in 1542. There were at Hamar a cathedral chapter with ten canons, a school, a Dominican Priory of St. Olaf, and a monastery of the Canons Regular of St. Anthony of Vienne.

== Episcopal ordinaries ==
(all Roman Rite; possibly incomplete)

Suffragan Bishops of Hamar

- Arnaldur (1152 – ?), previously Bishop of Garðar (Gardar) (Greenland) (1126 – 1150)
- Orm (1164? – ?)
- Ragnar (? – ?)
- Torir (? – ?)
- Ivar Skjalg (1194.06.29 – death 1221)
- Hallvard (1221 – death 1231)
- Pål (1232 – death 1251)
- Peter, Dominican Order (O.P.) (1253.03.11 – death 1260)
- Gilbert (1263.03.04 – 1275?)
- Torfinn, Cistercian Order (O. Cist.) (1278 – death 1285.01.08)
- Jørund (1286 – 1287.02.15), next Metropolitan Archbishop of Nidaros (Trondheim, Norway) (1287.02.15 – death 1309.04.11)
- Torstein (1288 – death 1304)
- Ingjald (1306 – death 1314)
- Bottolf (1318 – death 1319)
- Hallvard (1320.07.07 – death 1349)
- Olaf (? – ?)
- Håvard (1351.08 – death 1363)
- Magnus Slangestorp, O.P. (1364.05.29 – death 1380)
- Sigurd (1383 – death 1419)
- Annbjørn Sunnulvsson (1420.01.24 – ?)
- Peder Boson (1433.07.08 – death 1440?)
- Gunnar Thorgardsson (1442.06 – death 1473)
- Karl Sigurdsson (1476.12.22 – death 1487.12.28)
- Herman Trulsson (1488.05.28 – death 1503?)
- Karl Jensson Skonk (1504– 1512)
- Mogens Lauritsson (1513–1542)

== See also ==
- Cathedral Ruins in Hamar
- List of Catholic dioceses in Norway
