= Geir Grung (diplomat) =

Norwegian diplomat (1938–2005)

Geir Grung (17 August 1938 – 1 June 2005) was a Norwegian diplomat.

He was born in Bergen, and was a cand.mag. by education. He started working for the Norwegian Ministry of Foreign Affairs in 1969, was promoted to assistant secretary in 1977 and to spokesperson in 1980. He served in the Norwegian embassy in Paris from 1984 to 1989, as deputy under-secretary of state the Ministry of Foreign Affairs from 1991 to 1996 and as the Norwegian ambassador to Italy from 1996 to 2002.
