= Geir Grung (architect) =

Norwegian architect (1926–1989)

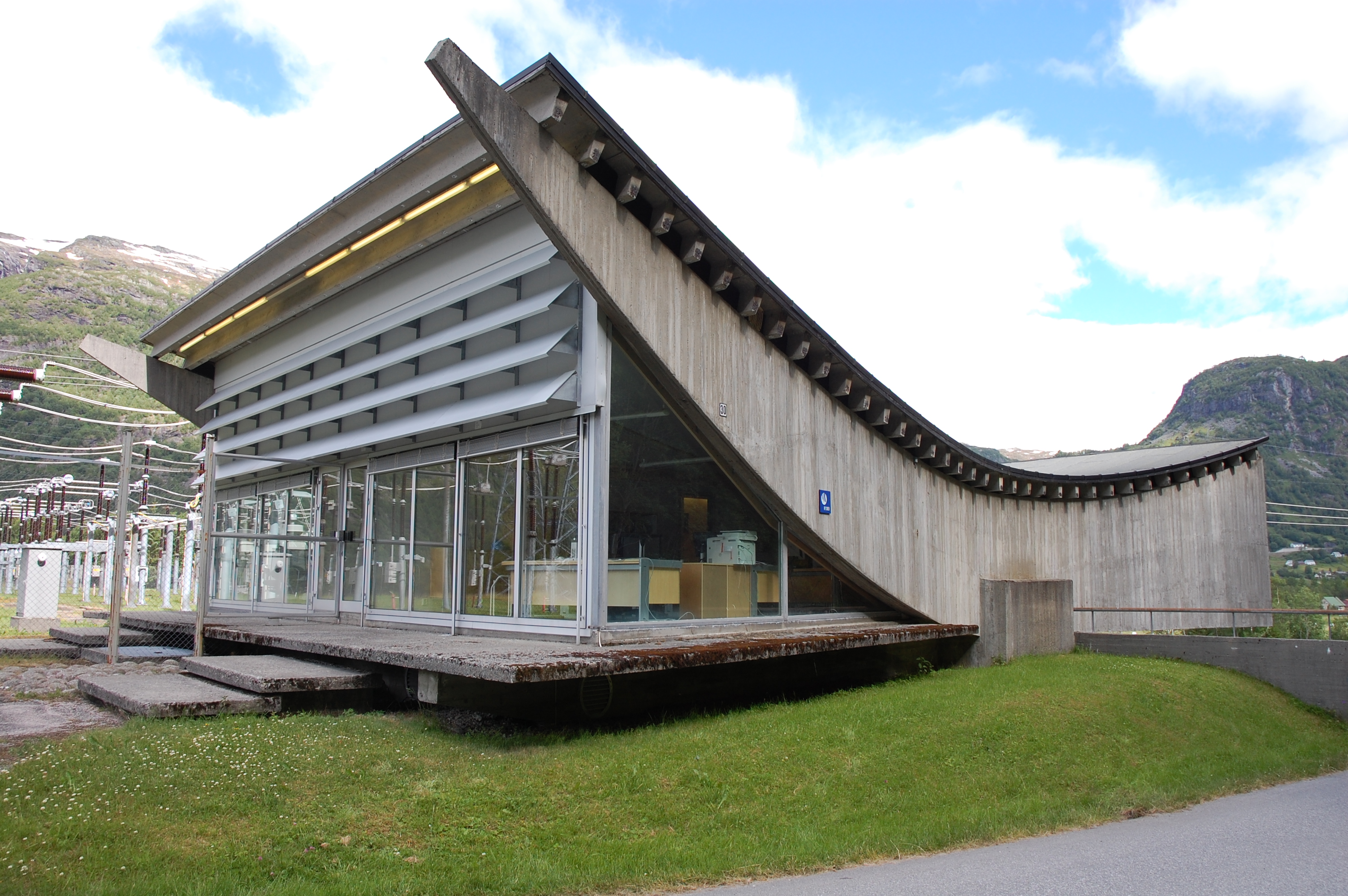
Røldal Kraftverk office and workshop building ( (1966)

Geir Grung (13 December 1926 – 16 March 1989) was a Norwegian architect. He was best known as a modernist who worked on a number of Norwegian power plants.

== Biography ==
He was born in Bergen, Norway as a son of functionalist architect Leif Kuhnle Grung (1894-1945) and Hjørdis Grace Lehmann (1895-1988). He worked as an assistant at his father's architectural firm, while he also trained at Bergen Arts School (Bergens kunsthåndverksskole). After his father's death in 1945, he became a student at the Norwegian National Academy of Craft and Art Industry in Oslo. Grung took the national architect examination (Statens arkitektkurs) in 1949.

In 1950, he established an architectural practice. In 1954 he entered into partnership with Georg Greve (Arkitektene Greve og Grung). When Greve retired in 1970, Grung continued on his own with the firm Geir Grung and after 1971 as Geir Grung A / S. Grung's start as an architect had coincided with an industrialization in the construction of building in Norway. He performed significant work in the context of hydro-power development. Grung was also a modernist and was involved with the group of architects known as Team 10. He was also an active participant in the Congrès International d'Architecture Moderne.

Grung was married twice. In 1951, he married Karen Sophie Kaltenborn (1930-1983), and the marriage dissolved 1974. In 1974, he married Dagny Kjøde (born 1945).

== Selected works ==
- Mykstufoss Power Plant portal building, 1964
- Tysso II Power Plant, 1967
- Senjaneset Transformer Station, Tyssedal, 1967
- Høyenhall School, 1967
- Lier Tunnel, 1963-73
- Tonstad Power Plant, 1968
- Tjørhom Power Plant, 1973
- Duge Power Plant, 1973
- Rafnes Petrochemical Plant for Norsk Hydro, 1974-77

== Gallery ==
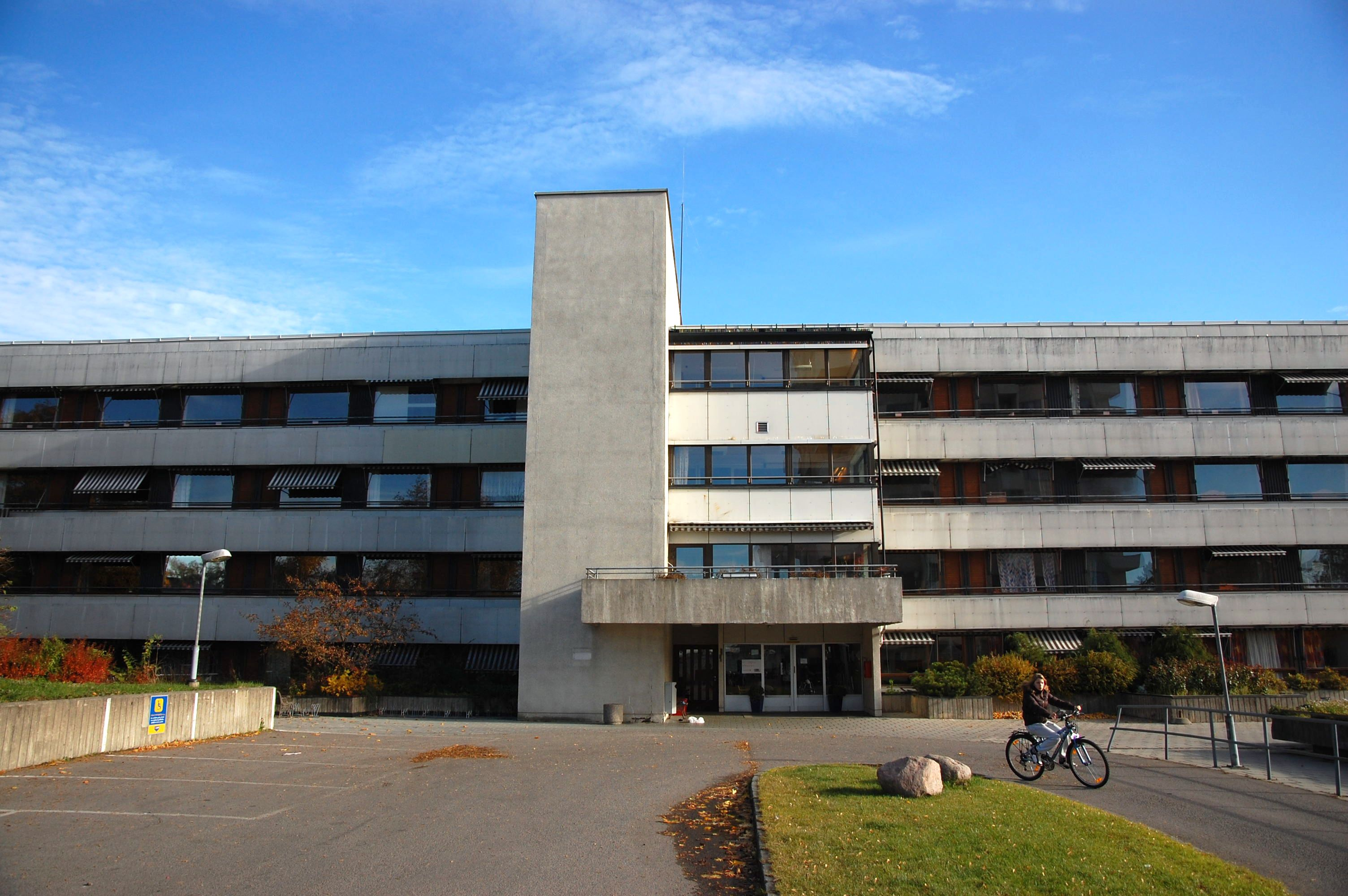
Økern Retirement and Nursing Homes, with Sverre Fehn (1955)

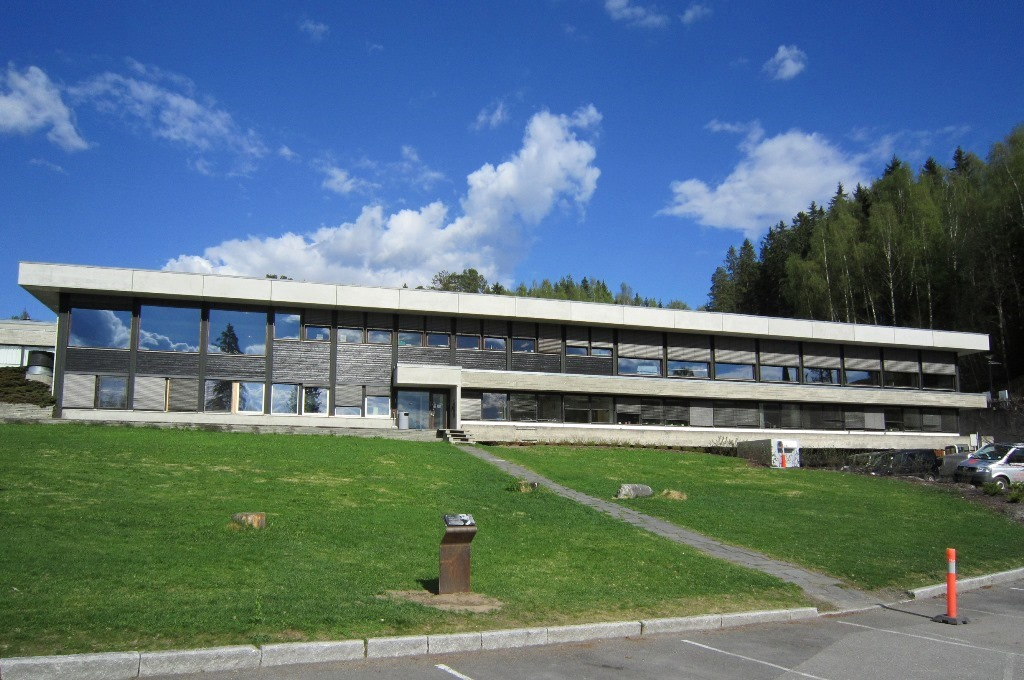
Maihaugen Folk Museum, Lillehammer (1959)

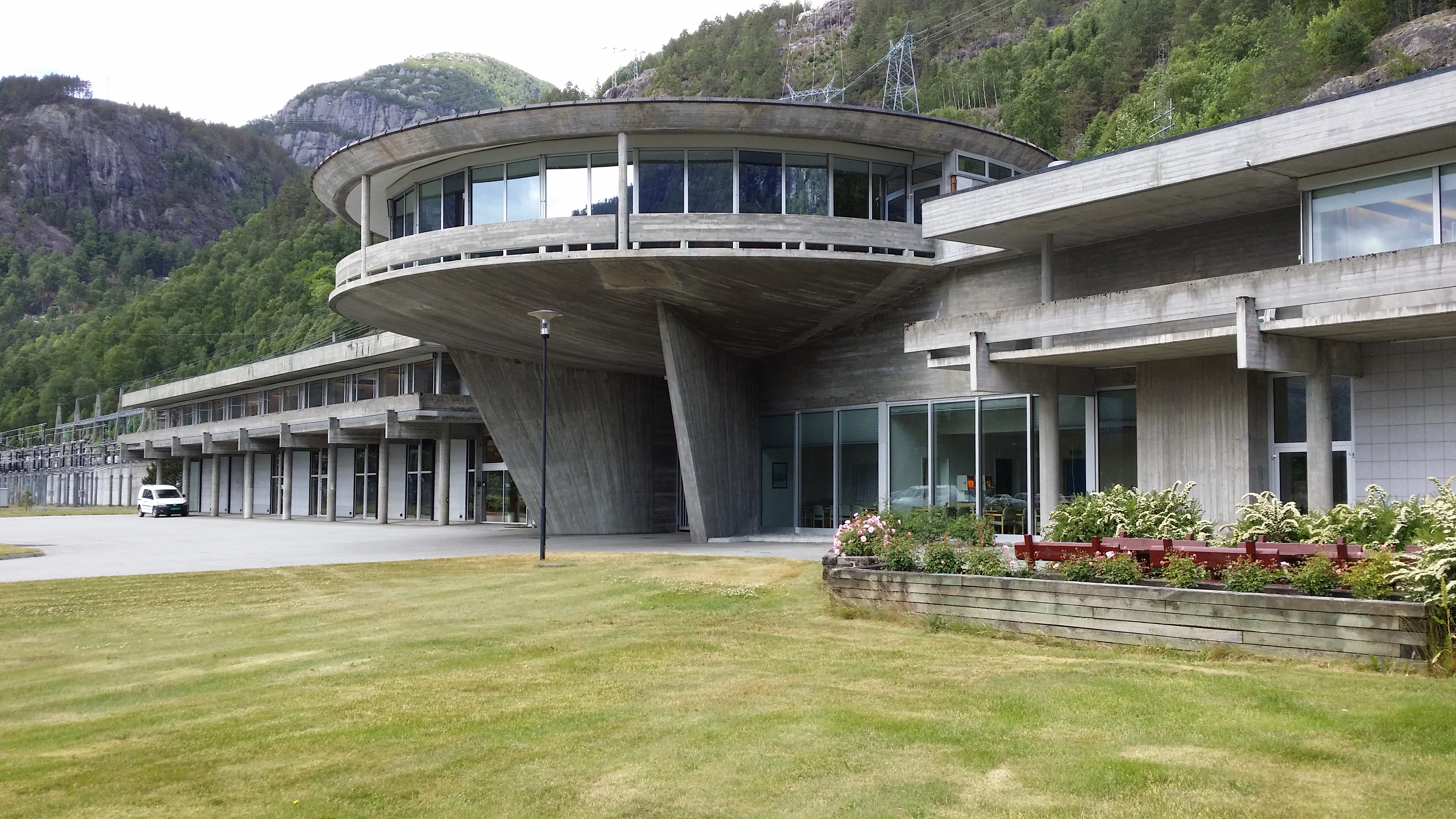
Suldal Hydro Power Station (1965)

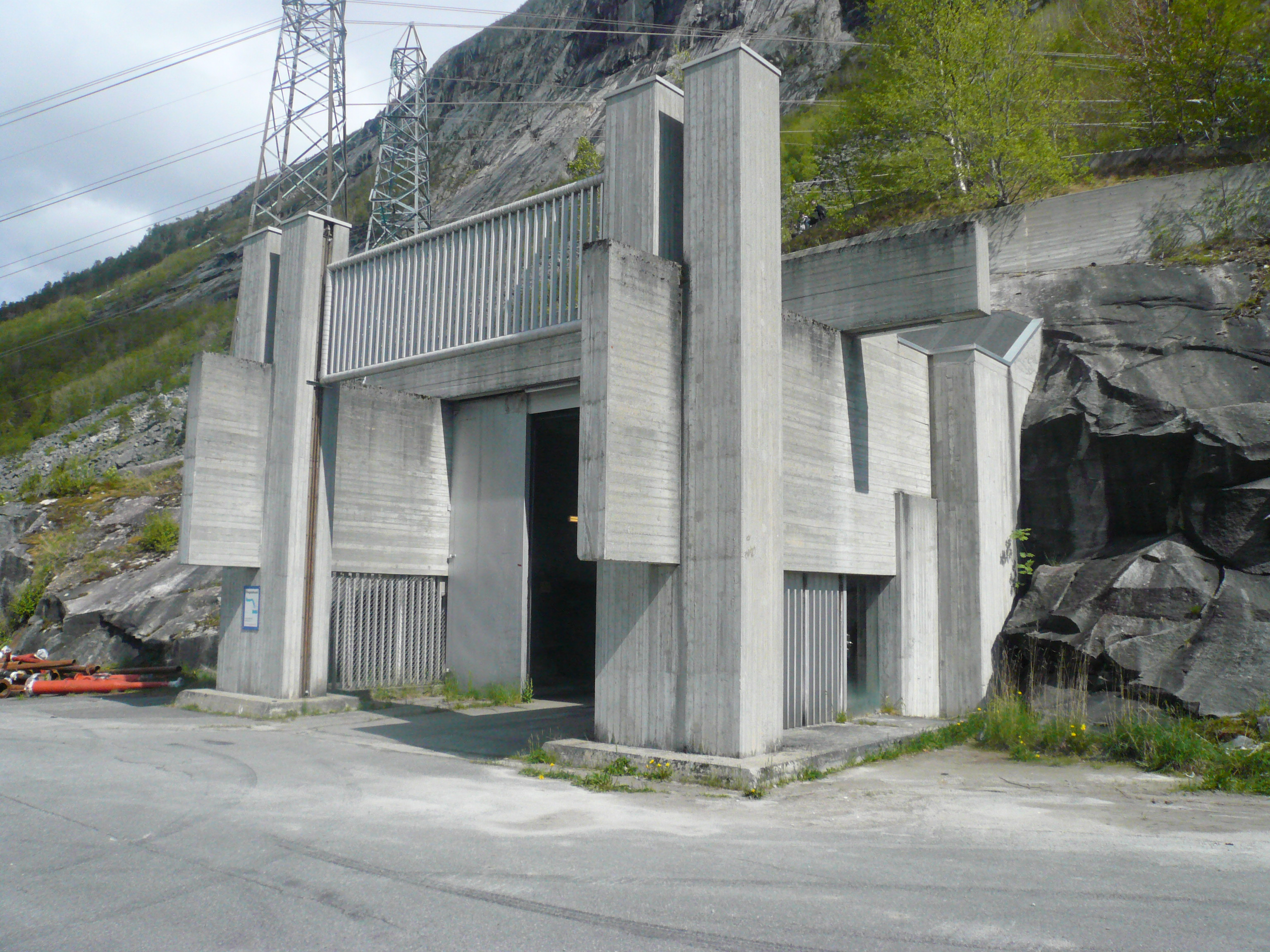
Tysso II Kraftverk (1967)

== Related reading ==
- Risselada, Max and van den Heuvel, Dirk (eds), (2005) Team 10 1953-1981, In Search of A Utopia of the Present (nai010 Publisher, Rotterdam) ISBN 90-5662-471-7
