= Ansgar (disambiguation) =

Ansgar (801–865) was an Archbishop of Hamburg-Bremen.

Ansgar may also refer to:

== People ==
- Ansgar (name), origin of the name and people named "Ansgar"

== Places ==
=== Churches ===
- Ansgar Church, Germany
- Ansgars Church, Denmark
- Ansgar's Church, Sweden
- St. Ansgar's Cathedral, Denmark
- St. Ansgar's Church, Norway

=== Other places ===
- St. Ansgar, Iowa, US
- St. Ansgar Township, Mitchell County, Iowa, US

== Other uses ==
- Ansgar von Lahnstein, a character on the German soap opera Verbotene Liebe

== See also ==
- Ansgarius (crater), lunar crater
- Vita Ansgari, the biography of Ansgar, written by Rimbert, his successor as archbishop in Hamburg-Bremen
