= St. Paul's Catholic School, Bergen =

St. Paul's School
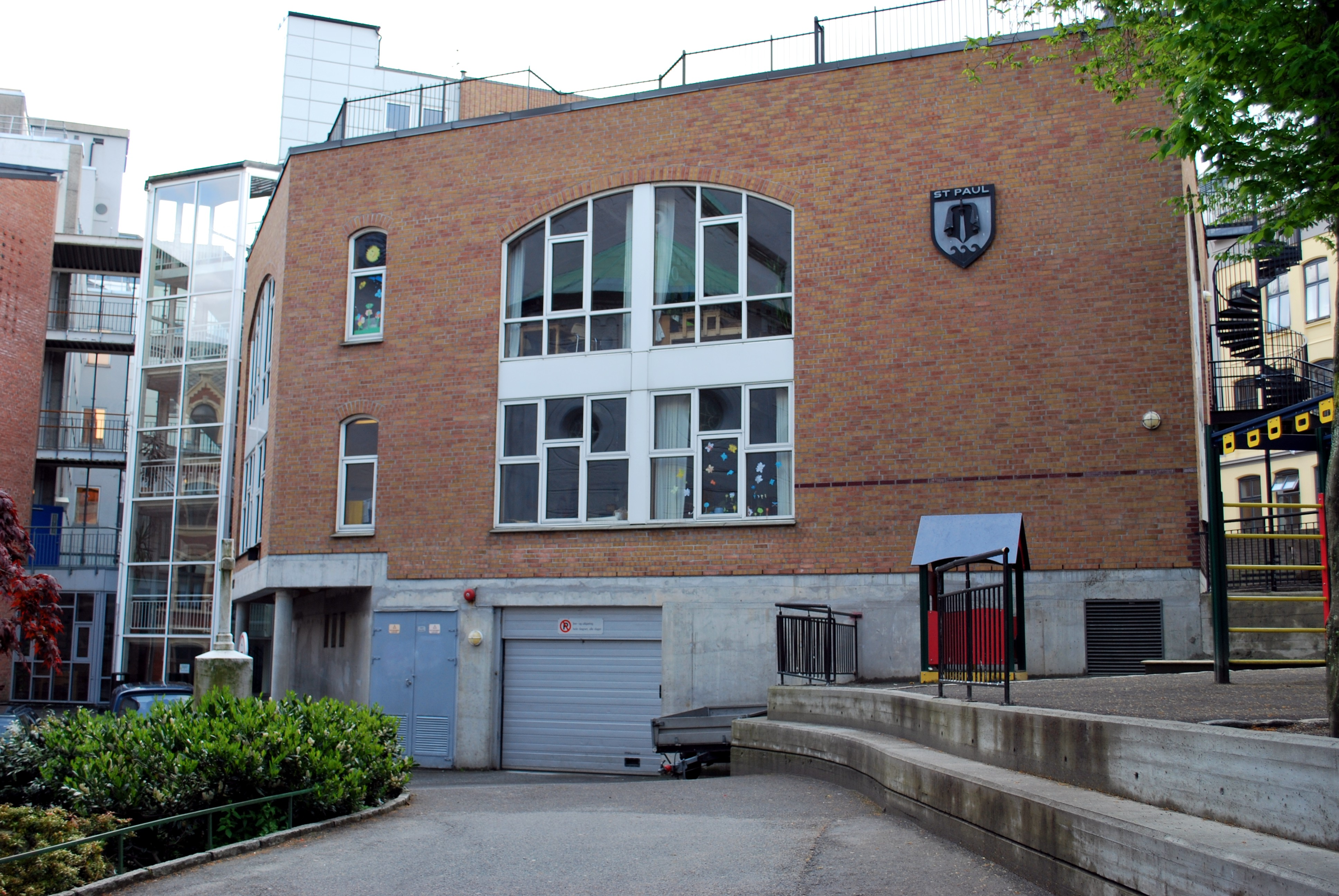
- The current main building.

Location
- Christies gate 16; 5015 Bergen; Norway
- Coordinates: 60.388804°N 5.323442°E

Information
- Motto: And Jesus increased in wisdom and stature, and in favour with God and man.
- Established: 1873
- Head of school: Ronny Michelsen
- Staff: 37
- Grades: 1st - 10th
- Enrollment: 337
- Campus type: Urban
- Website: https://stpaul.no

St. Paul's Catholic School is a Catholic primary and lower secondary school in Bergen, established in 1873 and owned by the Roman Catholic Diocese of Oslo. About 340 students attend the school from first to tenth grade. The headmaster is currently Ronny Michelsen. Starting 1 August 2024, Erik Michelsen Løland will become the new headmaster.

The school is located near Saint Paul's Catholic Church, Bergen and is closely attached to the church.

In Autumn 2012 the school opened a high school branch, St. Paul gymnas.

== See also ==
- Catholic Church in Norway
