= Catholic Church in Norway =

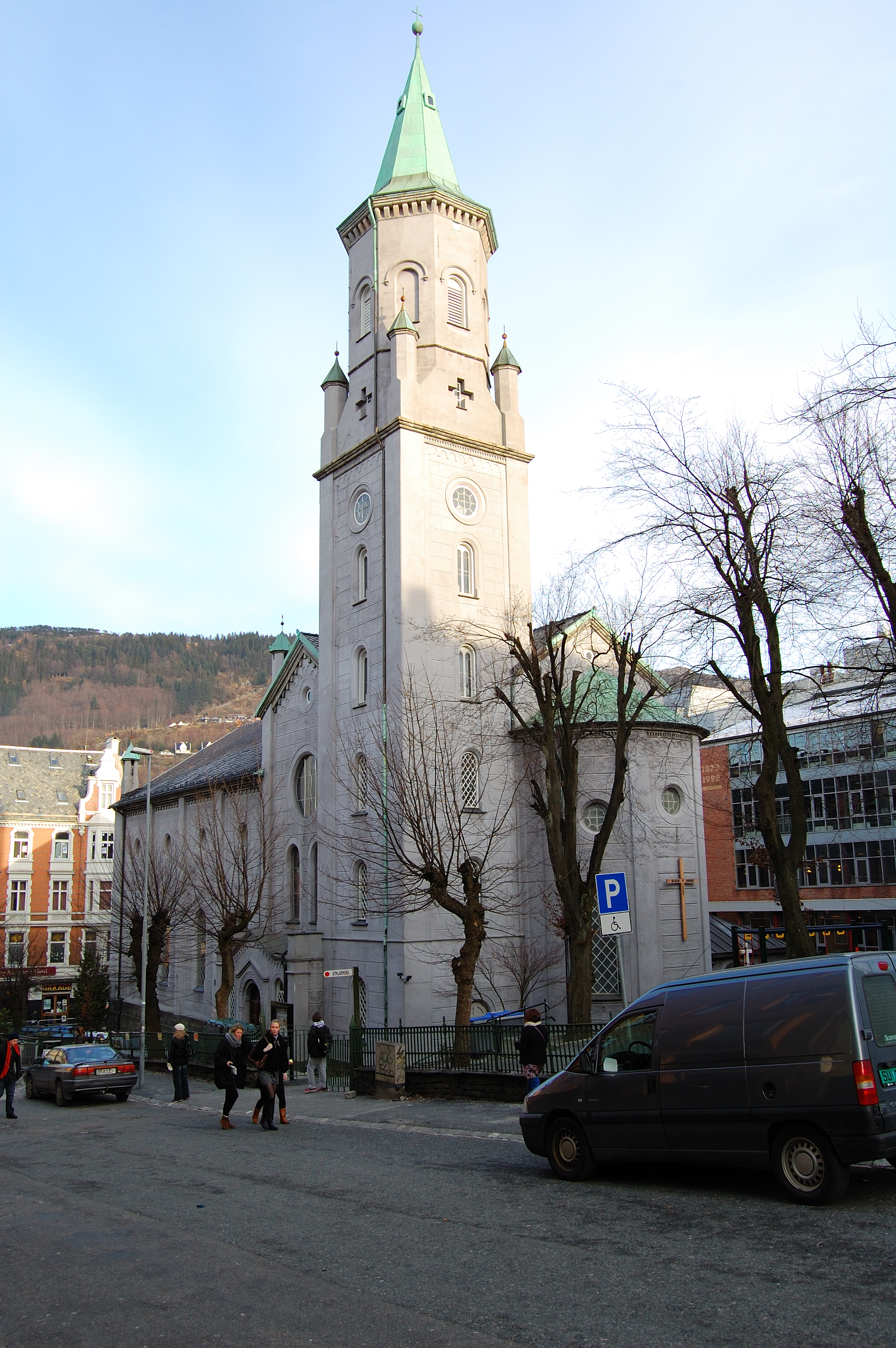
- Saint Paul Catholic Church, Bergen
- Classification: Catholic Church
- Orientation: Latin
- Region: Norway
- Origin: 934 AD
- Separations: Church of Norway

The Catholic Church in Norway (Norwegian: Den katolske kirke i Norge) is part of the worldwide Catholic Church. As of May 2014, there were over 151,000 registered Catholics in Norway. It is claimed there are many Catholics who are not registered with their personal identification number and who are not reported by the local church; the full number may be as high as 230,000, 70% of whom were born abroad. That constitutes about 5% of the population, making Norway the most Catholic country in Nordic Europe.

== Structure ==
The Catholic Church is the second largest religious community in Norway by number of registered members. The country is divided into three Church districts – the Diocese of Oslo and the prelatures of Trondheim and Tromsø, whose bishops participate in the Nordic Bishops Conference. The country is further divided into 38 parishes and three chapel districts.

Four religious orders have returned to Norway: the Cistercians, Dominicans, the Poor Clares, and the Trappistines. In 2007, monks from the Abbey of Cîteaux dedicated a new monastery at Frol, near Levanger in Nord-Trøndelag, naming it Munkeby Mariakloster. Trappistine nuns, likewise, bought land near the ruins of a pre-Reformation monastery on the island of Tautra in the Trondheimsfjord, moved to the site, and built a new cloister, workplace, guesthouse, and chapel, calling the new monastery Tautra Mariakloster. In addition to these four, 17 other orders are also working in the country, for instance the Sisters of St. Francis Xavier (Franciskussøstre), which is a unique order as it was founded in Norway in 1901. The Benedictines, who had a monastery on the island of Selja in the Medieval ages, were asked to return to Norway.

There are few Catholic welfare institutions in Norway today. There are no Catholic hospitals or orphanages, but the Catholic Church operates primary and secondary schools in Oslo, Arendal and Bergen, and Bodø. The Sisters of Saint Elizabeth operated St. Elizabeth's home for elderly in Oslo, until it was completely destroyed by fire in December 2014. Fransiskushjelpen (St. Francis Aid), a charity established in 1956 and run by Franciscans, remains active; Caritas Norway is a Catholic international relief and development organisation.

== History ==
=== Origin ===
The Catholic Church in Norway is almost as old as the kingdom itself, dating from approximately A.D. 900, with the first Christian monarchs, Haakon I from 934. The country is considered to have officially converted upon the death of the king St. Olav at the Battle of Stiklestad in 1030. The subsequent Christianisation took several hundred years.

Largely the work of Anglo-Saxon missionaries, the Norwegian Church has been considered the only daughter of English Catholicism. Cardinal Nicholas Breakspear, later Pope Adrian IV, established a church province in 1153, the Archdiocese of Nidaros (Trondheim).

=== Reformation to 1843 ===
The Lutheran Reformation in Norway lasted from 1526 to 1537. Catholic Church property and the personal property of Catholic priests were confiscated by the Crown. Catholic priests were exiled and imprisoned unless they submitted to conversion to the Danish king's faith. Bishop Jon Arason of Holar, executed in 1550, was the last Catholic bishop of Iceland (until the establishment of the Diocese of Reykjavik in 1923). The Bishop of Hamar from 1513 to 1537, Mogens Lauritssøn, was imprisoned until his death in 1542.

Many traditions from the Catholic Middle Ages continued for centuries more. In the late 18th century and into the 19th century, a strict and puritan interpretation of the Lutheran faith, inspired by the preacher Hans Nielsen Hauge, spread through Norway, and popular religious practices turned more purely Lutheran. The Catholic Church per se, however, was not allowed to operate in Norway between 1537 and 1843, and throughout most of this period, Catholic priests faced execution. In 1582, the scattered Catholics in Norway and elsewhere in Northern Europe were placed under the jurisdiction of a papal nuncio in Cologne, however, with threatening punishment Catholic pastoring could not materialise. In the late 16th century, a few incidents of crypto-Catholicism occurred within the Lutheran Church of Norway. However, these were isolated incidents.

The Congregation for the Propagation of the Faith, on its establishment in 1622, took charge of the vast Northern European missionary field, which – at its third session – it divided among the nuncio of Brussels (for the Catholics in Denmark and Norway), the nuncio at Cologne (much of Northern Germany) and the nuncio to Poland (Finland, Mecklenburg, and Sweden).

In 1688, Norway became part of the Apostolic Vicariate of the Nordic Missions. The Paderborn bishops functioned as administrators of the apostolic vicariate. Christiania (Oslo) had an illegal but tolerated Catholic congregation in the 1790s. In 1834, the Catholic missions in Norway became part of the Apostolic Vicariate of Sweden, seated in the Swedish capital of Stockholm. In 1843, the Norwegian Parliament passed a religious tolerance act providing for limited religious freedom and allowing for legal non-Lutheran public religious services for the first time since the Reformation.

=== Since legalisation in 1843 ===
The first parish after the Reformation was established in the capital in 1843; a few years later Catholic places of worship were opened in Alta (Finnmark), Tromsø and Bergen. Whereas Norway north of the polar circle became the Apostolic Prefecture of the North Pole in 1855, the rest of Norway stayed with the Swedish vicariate. When a new Norwegian Catholic missionary jurisdiction was established, it was not at any of the ancient episcopal sees but a mission “sui iuris” on 7 August 1868, created out of parts of North Pole prefecture and the Norwegian part of the Swedish vicariate. On 17 August 1869, the mission became the Apostolic Prefecture of Norway. On 11 March 1892, the Apostolic Prefecture of Norway was promoted to Apostolic Vicariate of Norway, with an altered name as the Apostolic Vicariate of Norway and Spitsbergen between 1 June 1913 and 15 December 1925. In 1897, the constitutional ban on religious orders was lifted, which in time led to the establishment of several communities and monasteries.

On 10 April 1931, the Apostolic Vicariate of Norway was divided into three separate Catholic jurisdictions:

- Southern Norway: Apostolic Vicariate of Oslo (extant 1931–1953), upgraded to the Diocese of Oslo in 1953
- Central Norway: Its jurisdiction (called Missionary District of Central Norway, 1931–1935; Apostolic Prefecture of Central Norway, 1935–1953; Apostolic Vicariate of Central Norway, 1953–1979) became the Prelature of Trondheim in 1979.
- Norway north of the polar circle: Its jurisdiction (called Missionary District of Northern Norway, 1931–1944; Apostolic Prefecture of Northern Norway, 1944–1955; Apostolic Vicariate of Northern Norway, 1955–1979) now forms the Prelature of Tromsø.

=== Sigrid Undset ===
In November 1924 the well-known Norwegian writer Sigrid Undset was received into the Catholic Church after thorough instruction from the Catholic priest in her local parish. She was 42 years old. She subsequently became a lay Dominican. It was the culmination of a long process whereby Undset – raised as a nominal Lutheran and for many years an agnostic – had experienced a crisis of faith due to the horrors of the First World War combined with the failure of her marriage. At the time of her move towards Catholicism she also wrote two series of historical novels, Kristin Lavransdatter and The Master of Hestviken, which take place in medieval times when Norway had been a Catholic country, as well as having studied Old Norse manuscripts and medieval chronicles and visited and examined medieval churches and monasteries, both at home and abroad. In Norway, Undset's conversion to Catholicism was not only considered sensational; it was scandalous. At the time, there were very few practicing Catholics in Norway, which was an almost exclusively Lutheran country. Anti-Catholicism was widespread not only among the Lutheran clergy, but through large sections of the population. Likewise, there was just as much anti-Catholic scorn among the Norwegian intelligentsia, many of whom were adherents of socialism and communism. The attacks against her faith and character were quite vicious at times, with the result that Undset's literary gifts were aroused in response. For many years, she participated in the public debate, going out of her way to defend the Catholic Church. In response, she was swiftly dubbed "The Mistress of Bjerkebæk" and "The Catholic Lady".

=== Catholic immigrants ===
The Catholic Church remained very much a minority church of a few thousand people up to the decades following World War II. However, with increased immigration from the 1960s onwards, the Catholic Church grew quickly: from 6,000 in 1966 to 40,000 in 1996 and to over 200,000 in 2013.

At first, the immigrants came from Germany, the Netherlands, and France. Immigration from Chile, the Philippines, and from a wide range of other countries began in the 1970s. Among the largest groups are Vietnamese and Tamils. This development has further increased after 2008 with a high number of economic migrants from Poland and Lithuania. Poles, who number an estimated 120,000 as of 2006, are currently the largest group of Catholics in Norway. As of 2015, besides members of the Latin Church, there were Chaldean Catholics with their own priest.

=== Membership inflation fraud conviction ===
In 2015, it was discovered that the Catholic Diocese of Oslo had stated too high membership numbers in the period 2010 to 2014, and therefore received too many state subsidies. The diocese applied for and received state support on behalf of all the Catholic congregations in Norway, because it kept the centralised membership register for all the country's Catholic congregations. It emerged that employees in the Diocese of Oslo had "used the telephone directory to select names that appear Catholic", for example by appearing to be Polish or Spanish. The diocesan staff searched for the social security numbers of these people, entered them in the membership register and demanded state support for these alleged members. The County Governor of Oslo and later also the Ministry of Culture then demanded that the diocese return the funds that they had been wrongfully paid. The case ended in court, and both the district court on 20 November 2017 and the Court of Appeal on 13 March 2019 upheld the State's decision that the money, almost 40.6 million Norwegian kroner, should be repaid by the Catholic Church in Norway. Additionally, a 2 million kroner fine for gross fraud and just over 300,000 kroner for the state's legal costs for the appeal trial had to be paid by the Diocese of Oslo.

== Members ==
Year	Members	Percent
1971	9,366	0.24%
1980	13,923	0.34%
1990	26,580	0.62%
2000	42,598	0.98%
2010	66,972	1.37%
2011	83,018	1.68%
2012	102,286	2.04%
2018	157,220	2.96%

Municipality	Catholics (2003)	Percent	Catholics (2004)	Percent	Catholics (2013)	Percent
Oslo Municipality	14,908	2.8%	13,300	2.5%	34,000	5.4%
Bergen Municipality	3,873	1.6%	4,044	1.7%	13,000	4,8%
Bærum Municipality	1,816	1.7%	1,666	1.6%	___	
Stavanger Municipality	1,720	1.5%	1,568	1.3%	10,000	7.7%
Trondheim Municipality	1,434	0.9%	1,416	0.9%	5,000	2.7%
Kristiansand Municipality	1,251	1.6%	1,150	1.5%	___	

== List of Catholic parishes in Norway ==
In the Diocese of Oslo

- Saint Olaf Cathedral, (Oslo) from 1843
- Saint Paul, (Bergen) from 1858
- Saint Peter (Halden) from 1870
- Saint Bridget (Fredrikstad) from 1878
- Our Lady of Good Counsel (Porsgrunn) from 1889
- Saint Ansgar (Kristiansand) from 1890
- Saint Hallvard, (Oslo) from 1890
- Saint Svithun, (Stavanger) from 1898
- Saint Lawrence (Drammen) from 1899
- Saint Francis Xavier (Arendal) from 1911
- Saint Torfinn (Hamar) from 1924
- Saint Mary (Stabekk, Bærum) from 1926
- Saint Joseph (Haugesund) from 1926
- Saint Olaf (Tønsberg) from 1929
- Saint Teresa (Hønefoss) from 1935
- Saint Magnus (Lillestrøm) from 1952
- St. Mary's Church (Lillehammer) from 1956
- Saint Michael (Moss) from 1989
- Saint Mary (Askim) from 1992
- Saint Francis (Larvik)from 1993
- Saint Thomas (Valdres), chapeldistrict from 2007
- Saint Gudmund (Jessheim) from 2007
- Saint Clare (Kongsvinger) from 2007
- Saint John the Baptist (Sandefjord) from 2010
- Saint John the Evangelist (Oslo) from 2013
- Saint Elisabeth (Bærum) from 2018

In the Prelature of Tromsø

- Our Lady (Tromsø) from 1859 (Cathedral)
- Saint Michael (Hammerfest, including Saint Joseph, Alta (1855)) from 1874
- Saint Sunniva (Harstad) from 1893
- Holy Family (Stamsund) from 1935
- Saint Augustine of Nidaros [St. Eystein] (Bodø) from 1951
- Christ the King (Narvik) from 1988
- Holy Spirit (Mosjøen) from 2003

In the Prelature of Trondheim

- Sacred Heart (Trondheim) from 1872, merged with Saint Olaf in 1929
- Saint Olaf (Trondheim) from 1902 (Cathedral)
- Saint Sunniva (Molde) from 1923
- Saint Augustine of Nidaros [St. Eystein] (Kristiansund) from 1934
- Our Lady (Ålesund) from 1959
- Saint Torfinn (Levanger) from 1964

== Churches ==
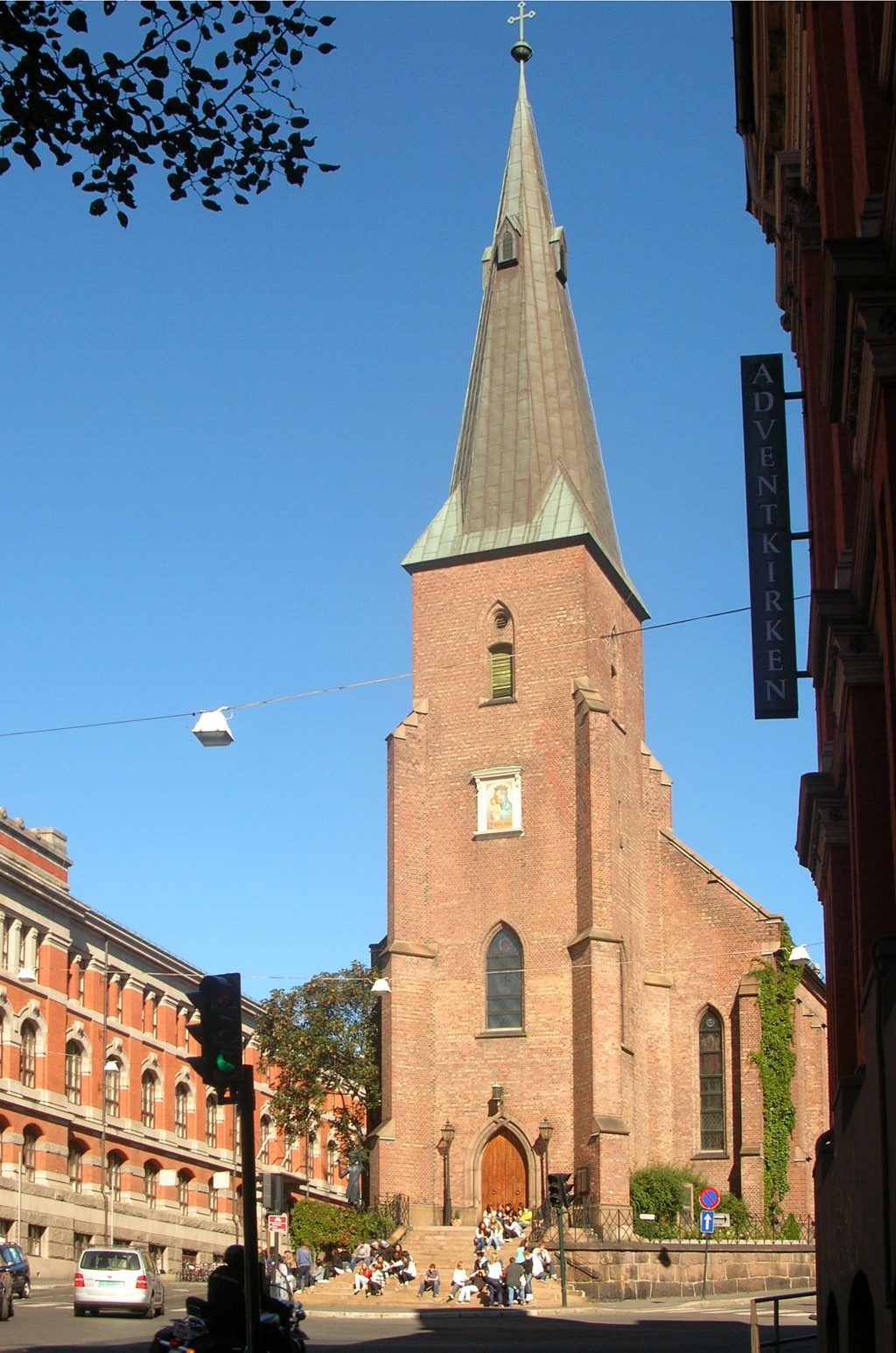
Saint Olaf's Cathedral, (Oslo)

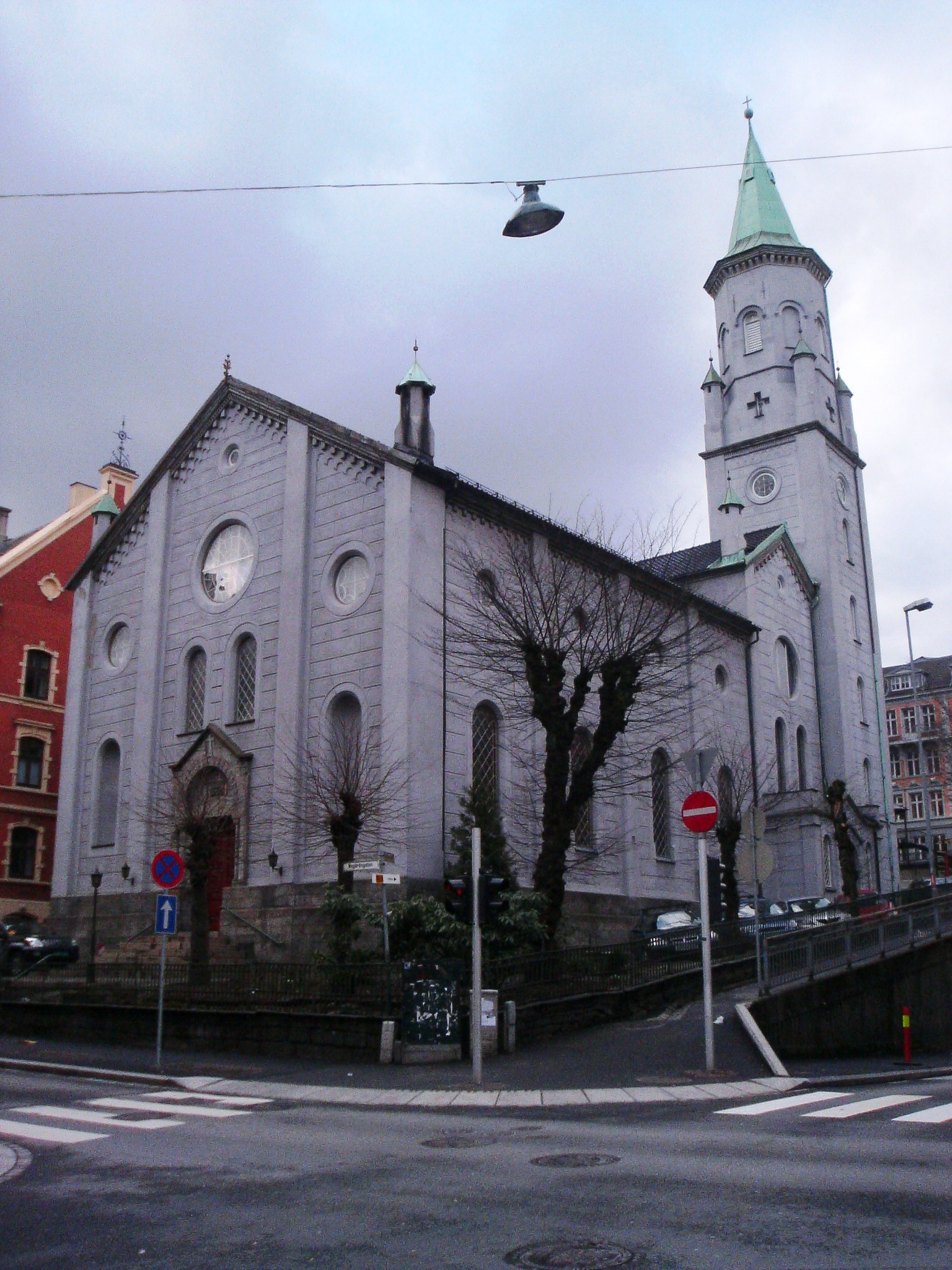
Saint Paul's Church, Bergen

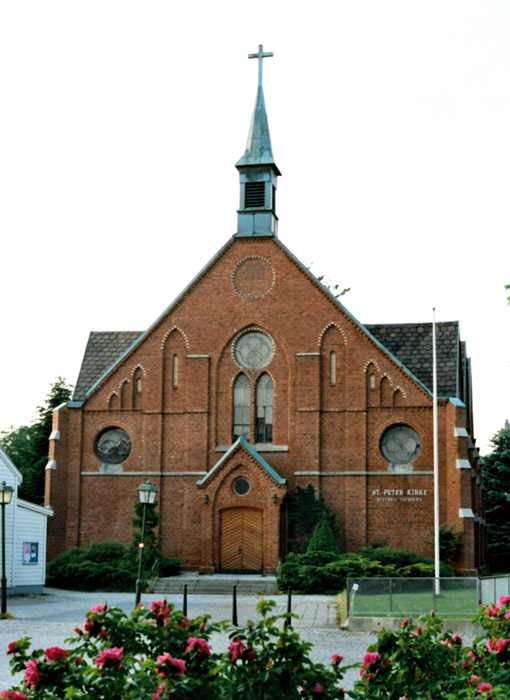
Saint Peter's Church, Halden

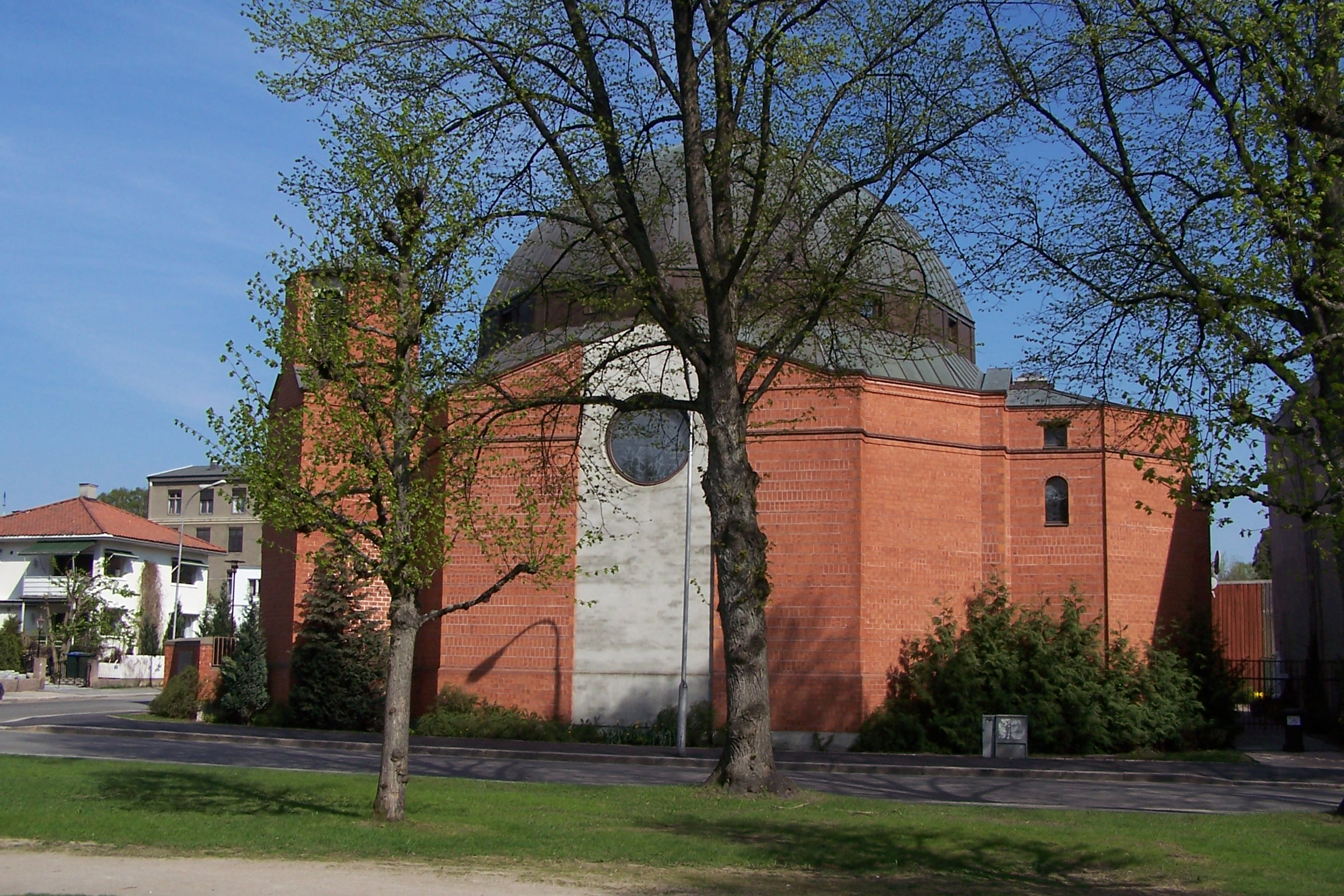
Santa Bridget's Church, Fredrikstad

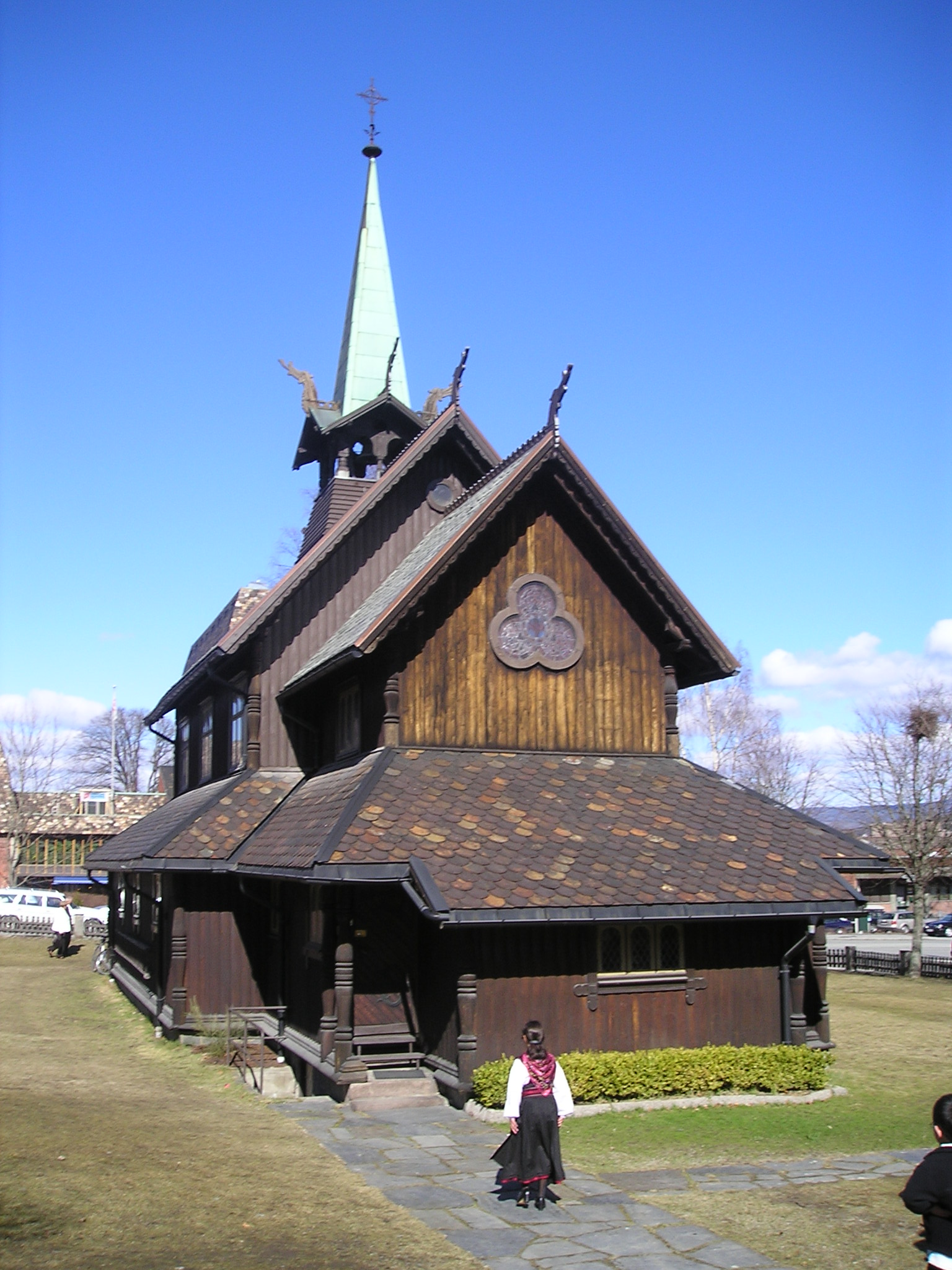
Our Lady's Church, Porsgrunn

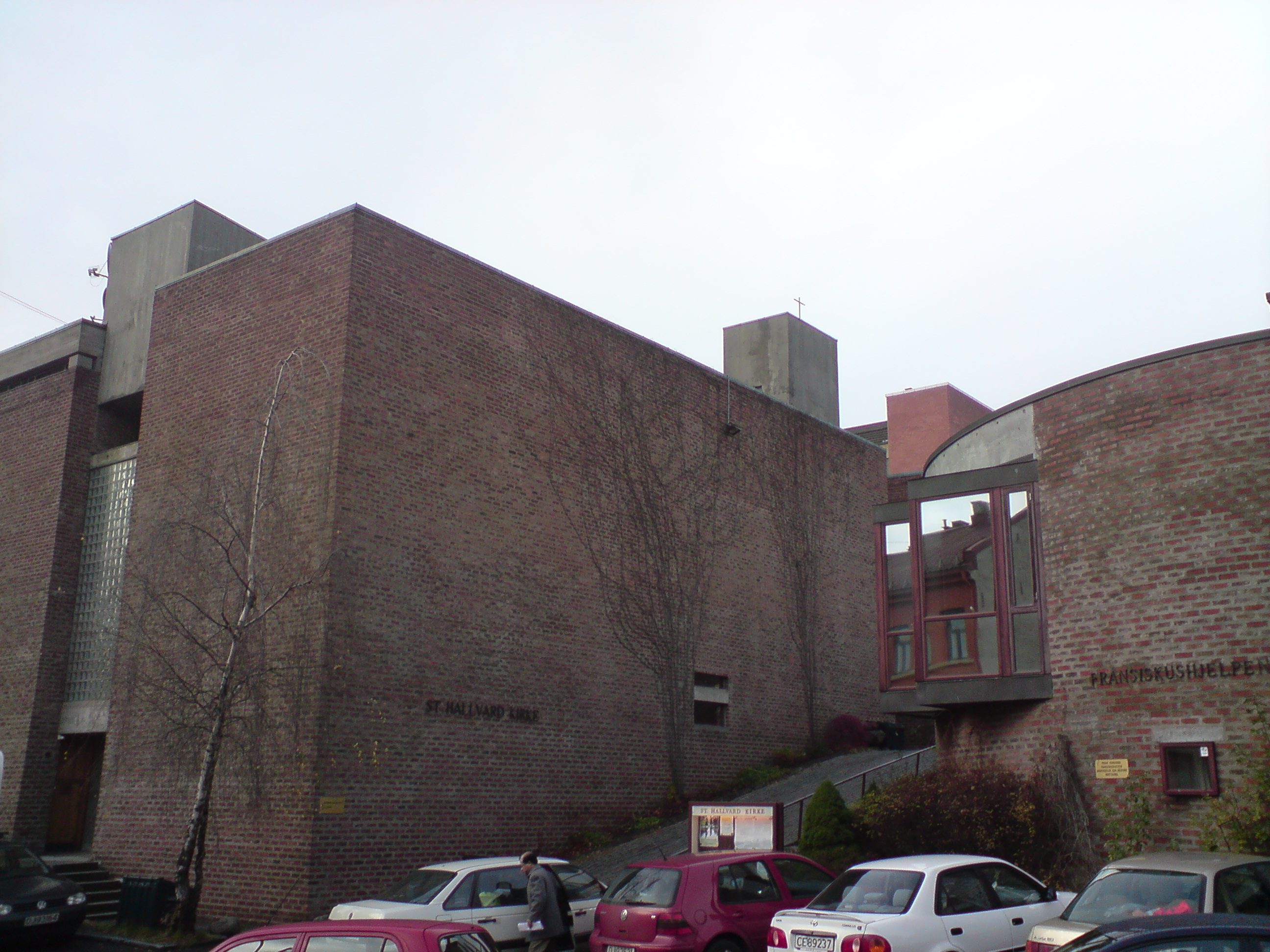
St. Hallvard's Church and Monastery, Oslo

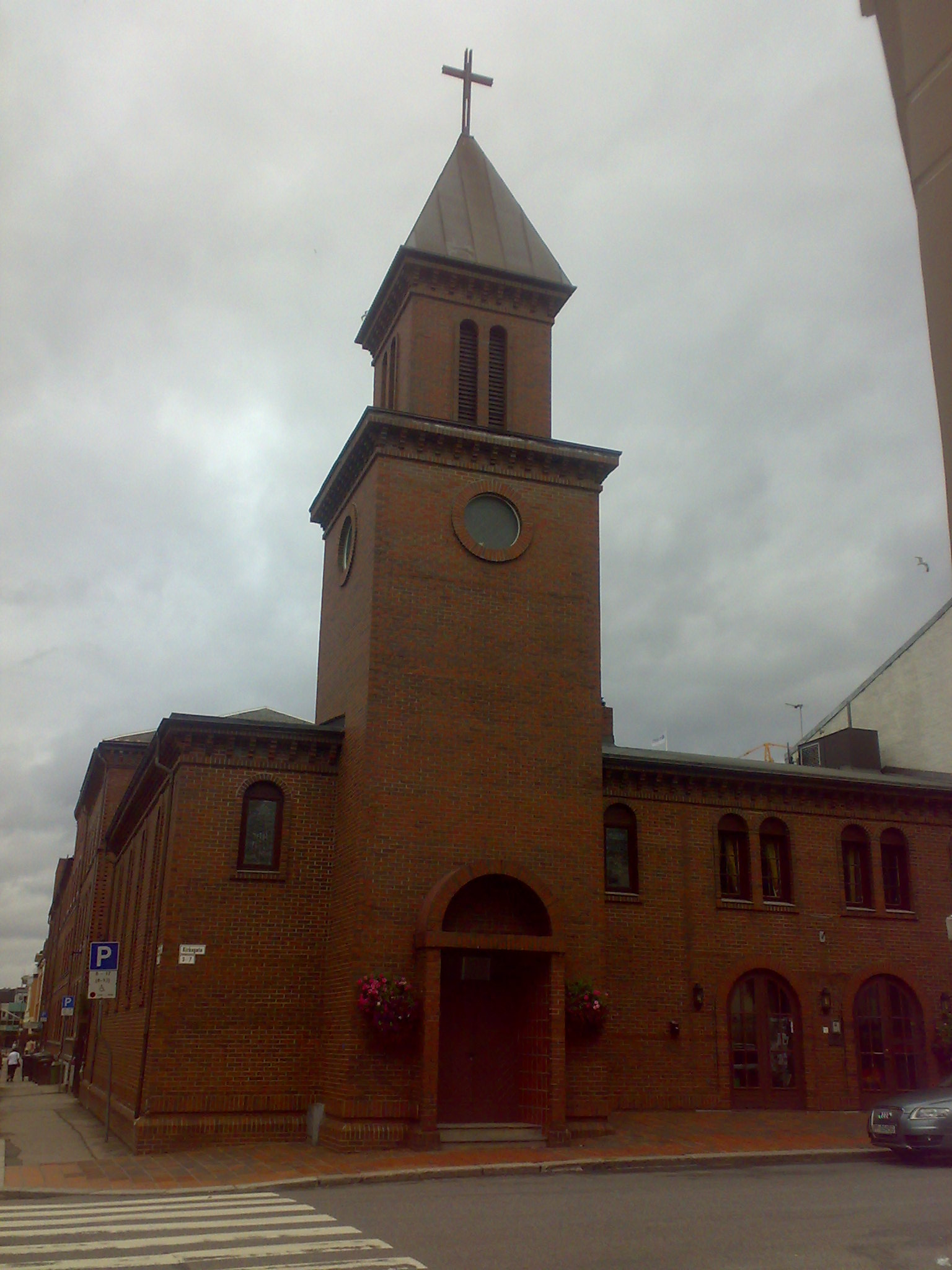
Saint Ansgar's Church, Kristiansand

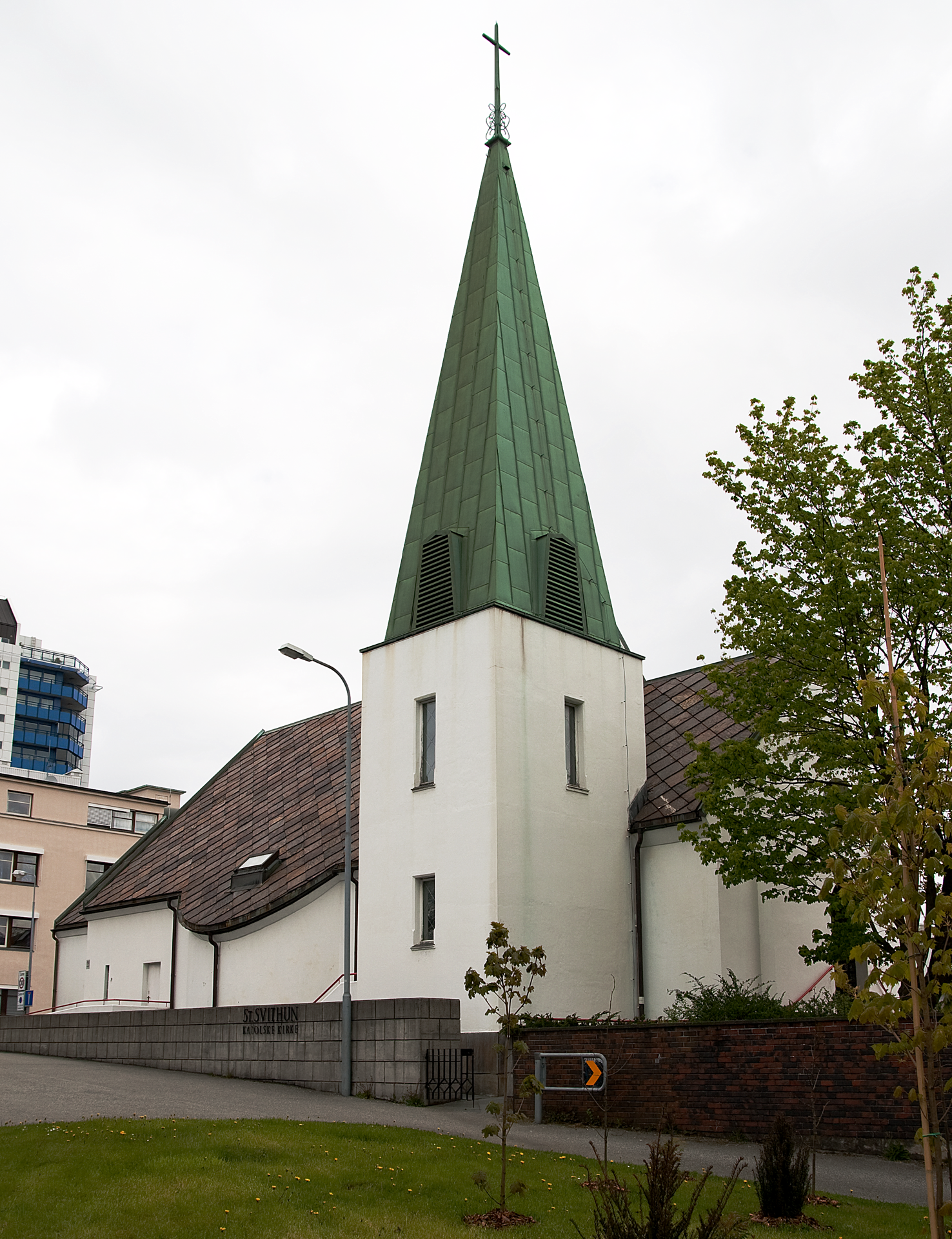
Saint Svithun's Church, Stavanger

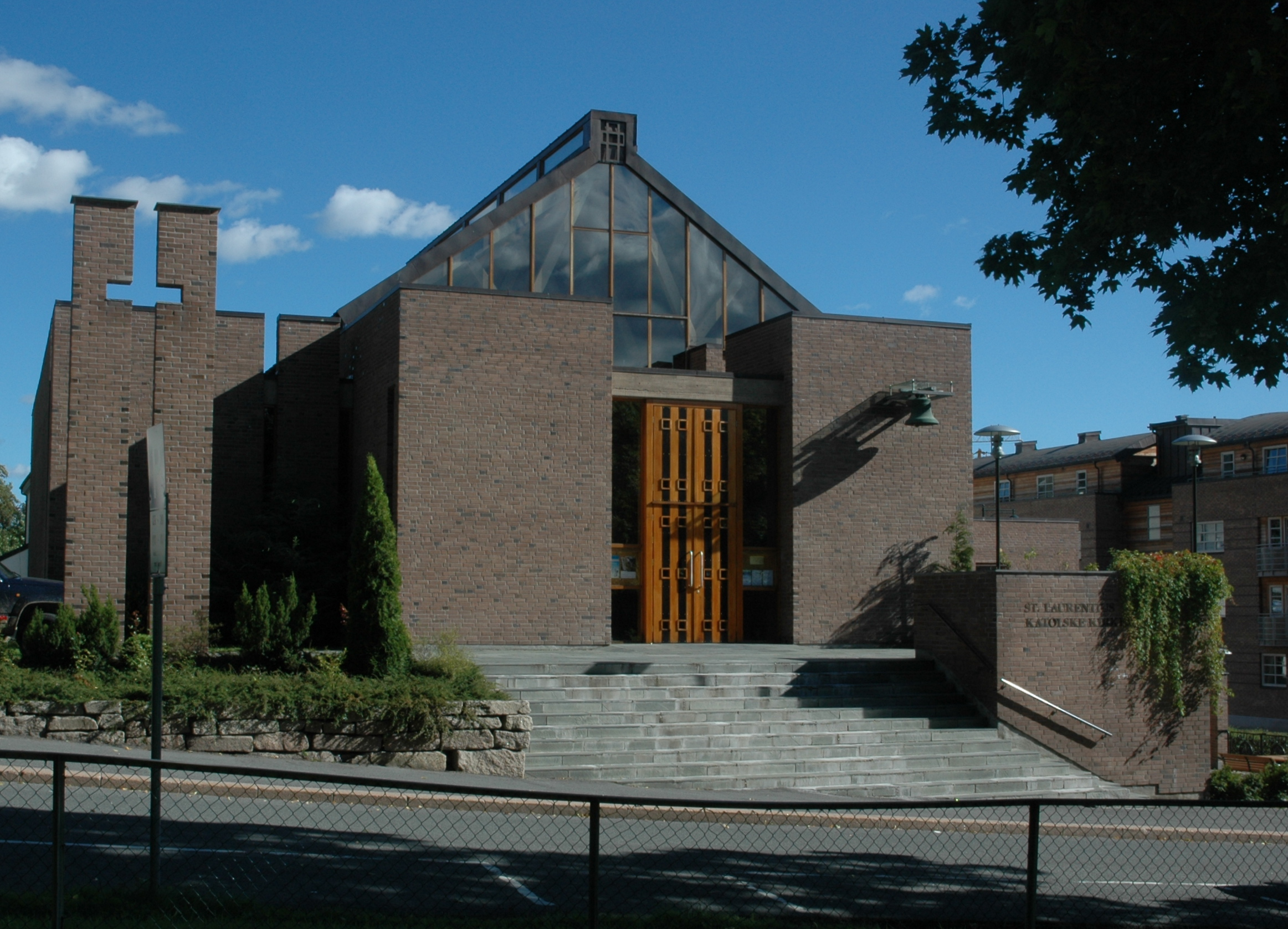
Saint Lawrence's Church, Drammen

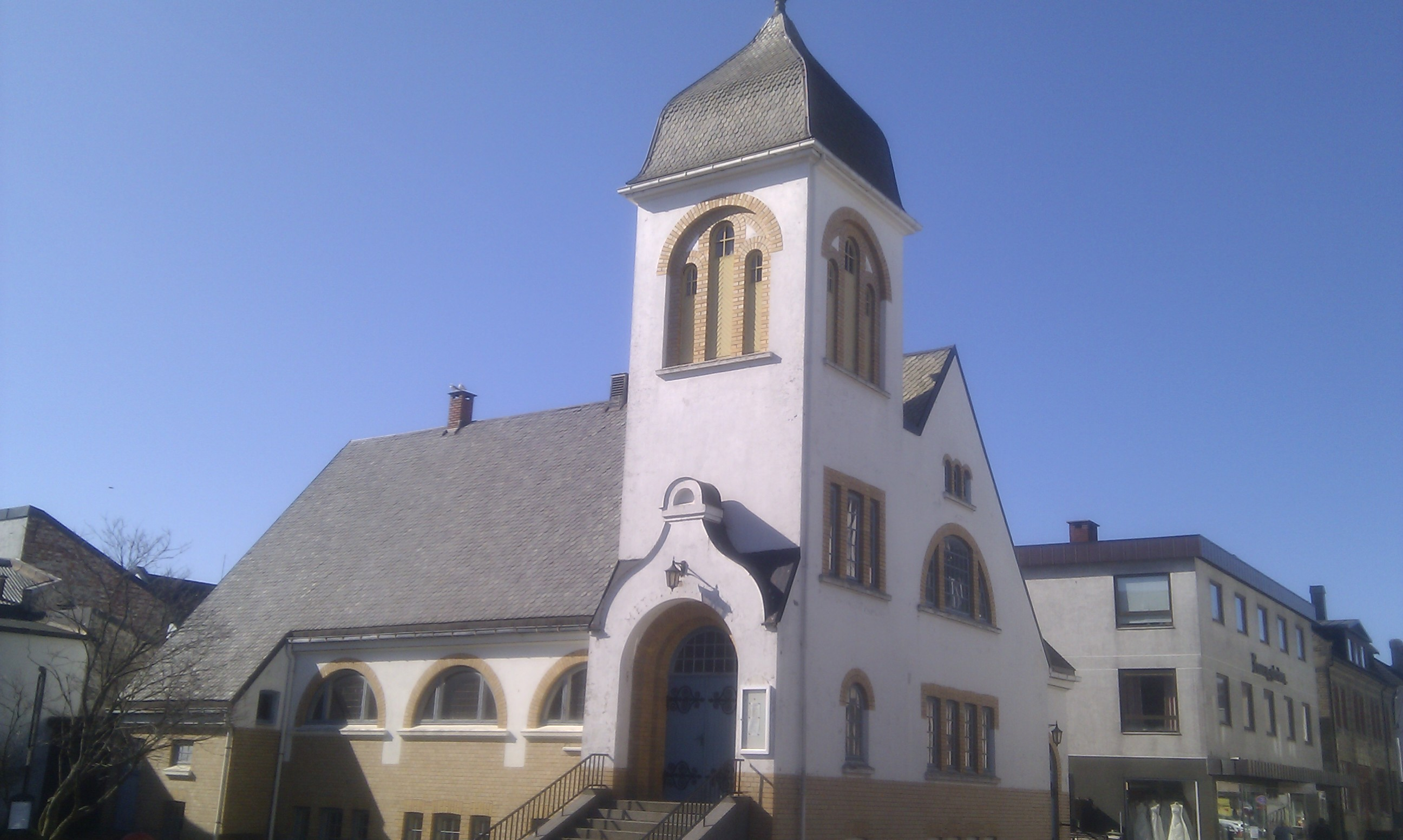
Saint John the Baptist's Church, Sandefjord

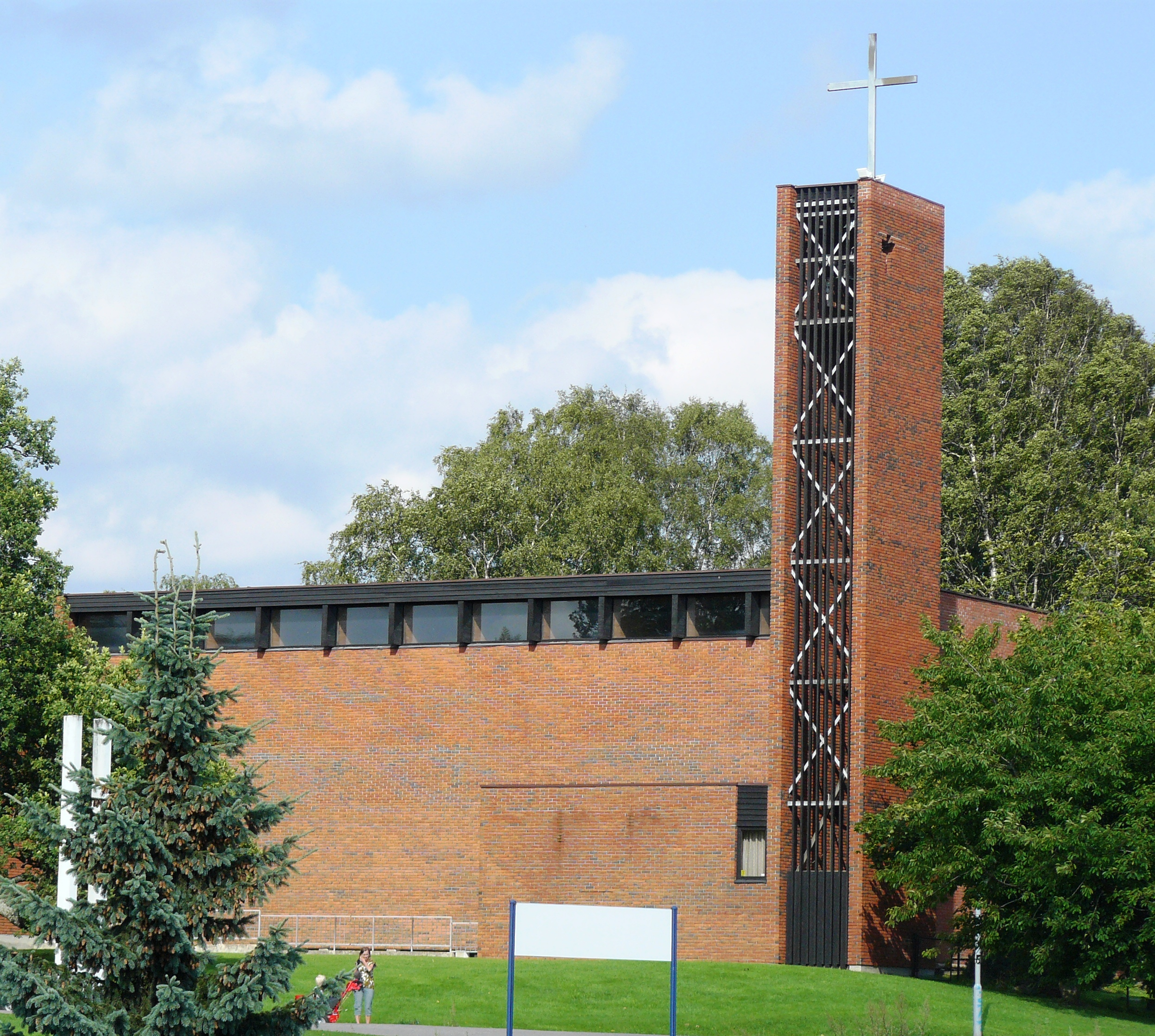
Saint John the Evangelist's Church, Oslo

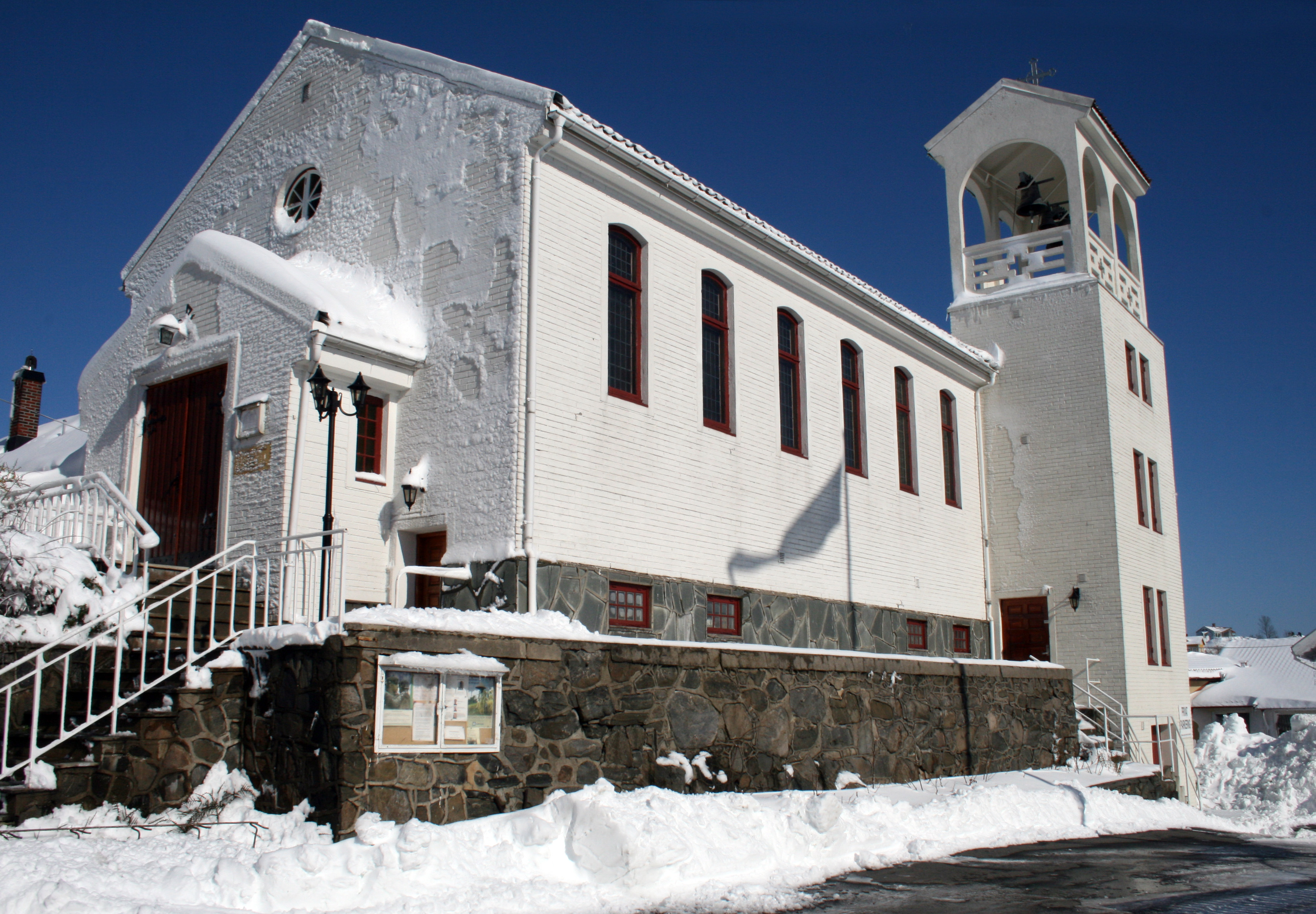
Saint Francis Xavier's Church, Arendal

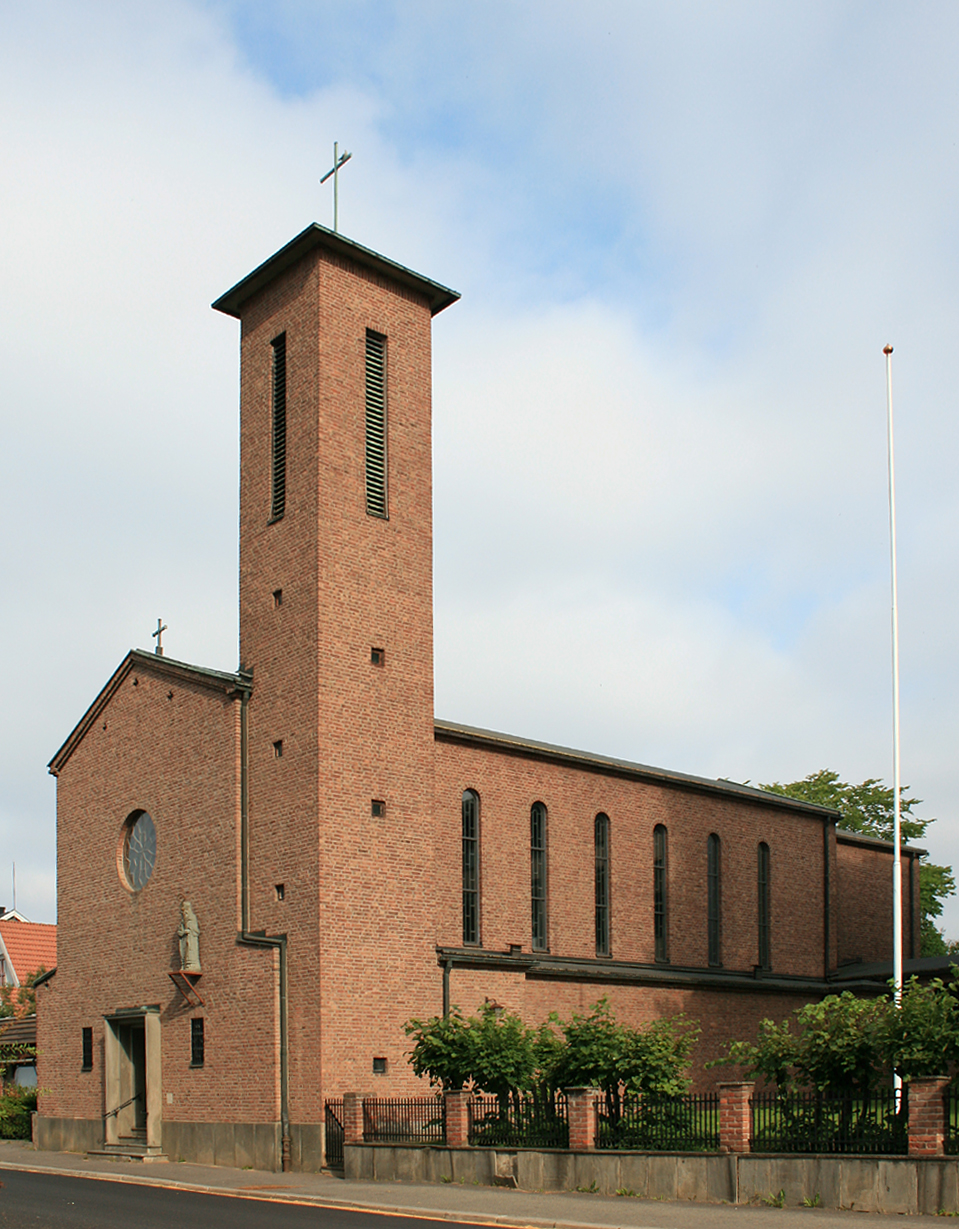
Saint Thorfinn's Church, Hamar

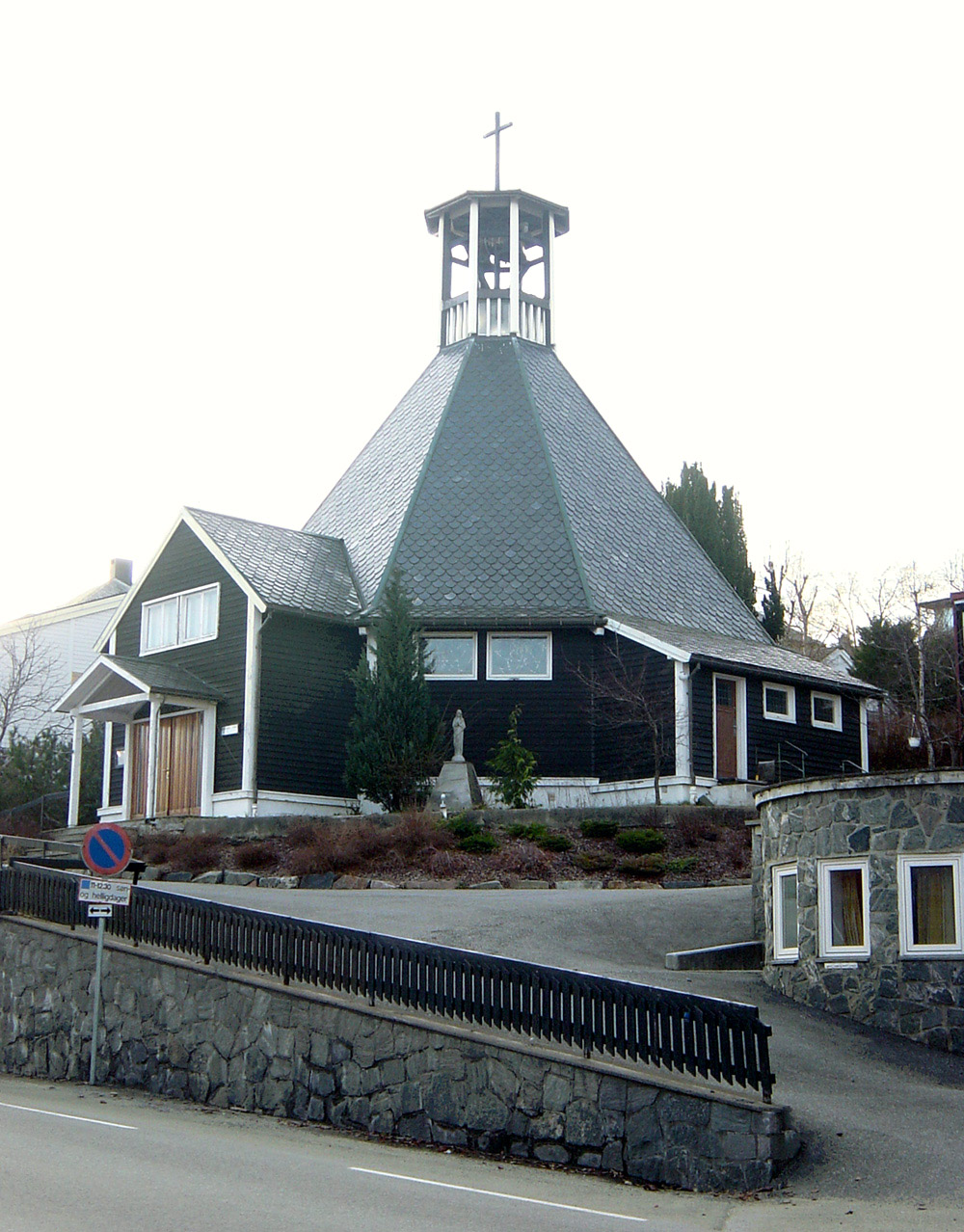
Santa Sunniva`s Church, Molde

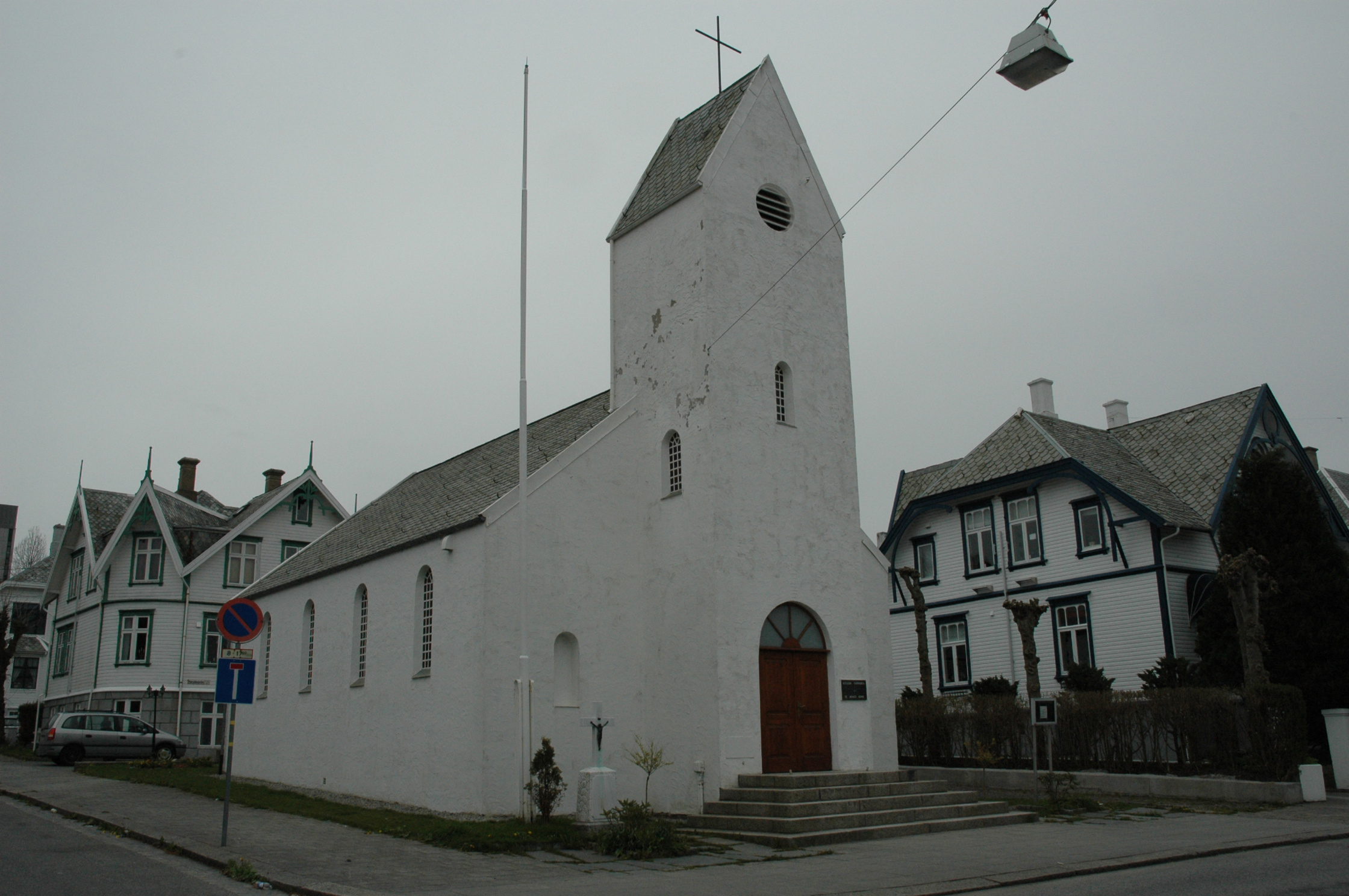
Saint Joseph's Church, Haugesund

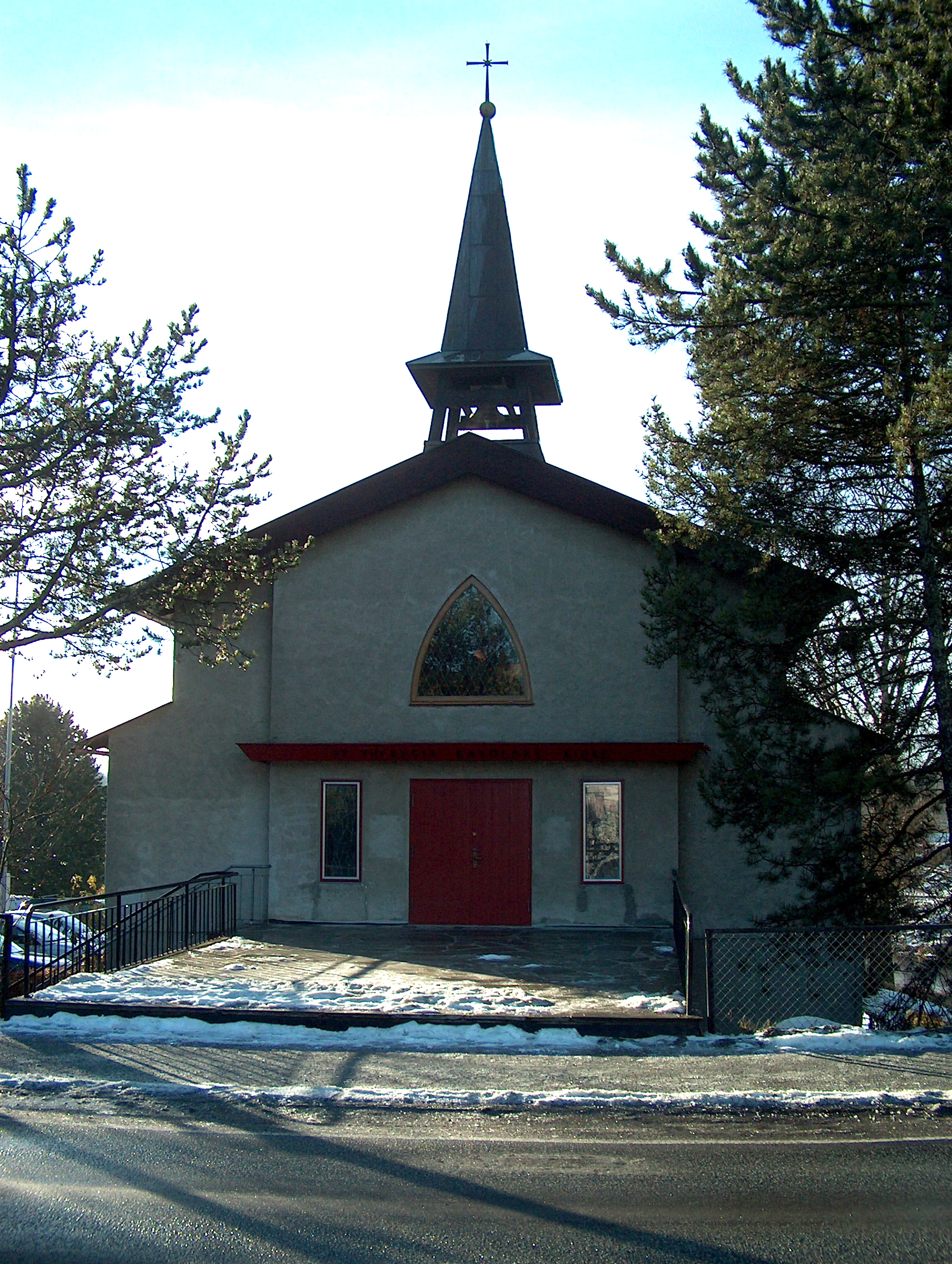
Santa Teresa's Church, Hønefoss

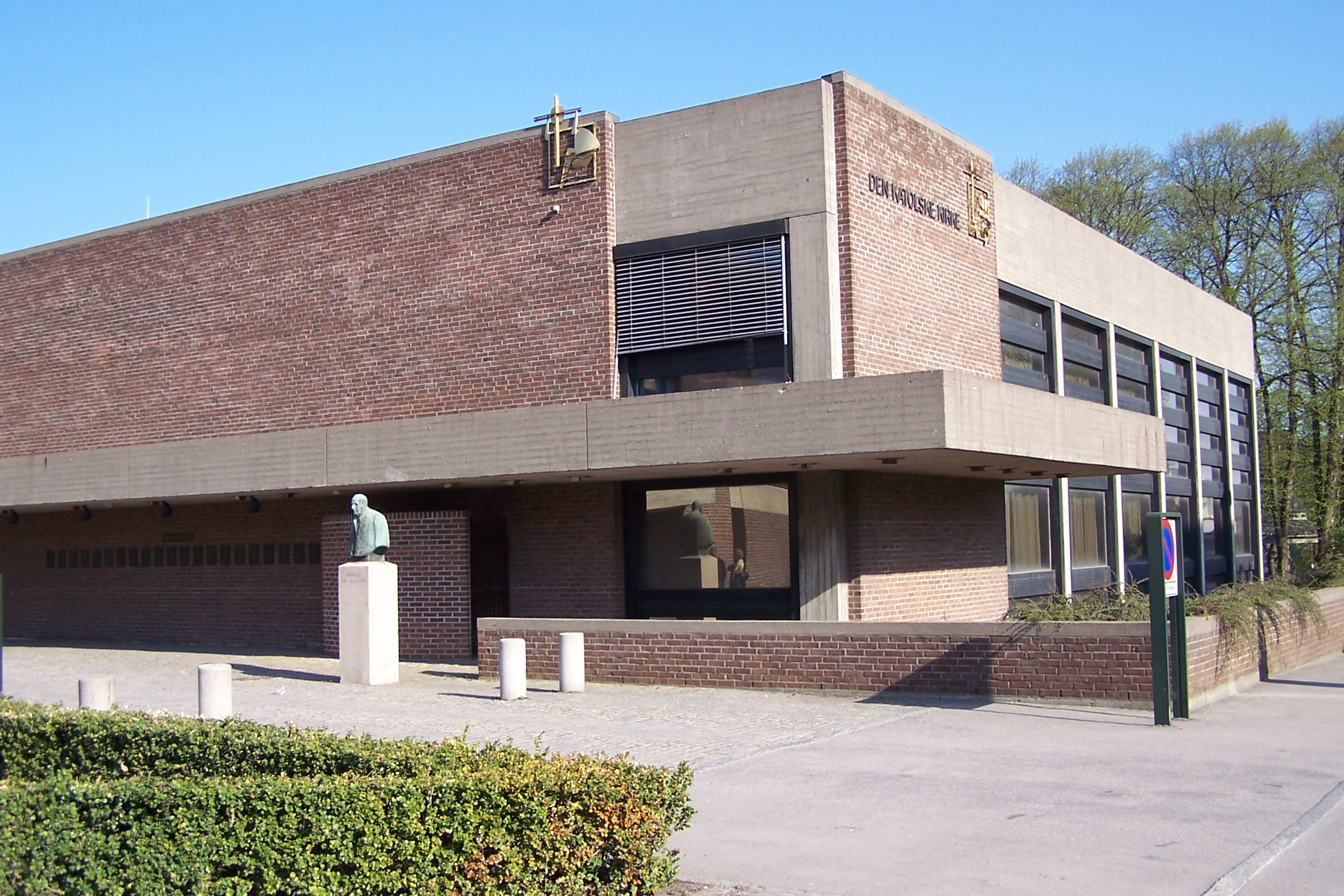
Saint Michael's Church, Moss

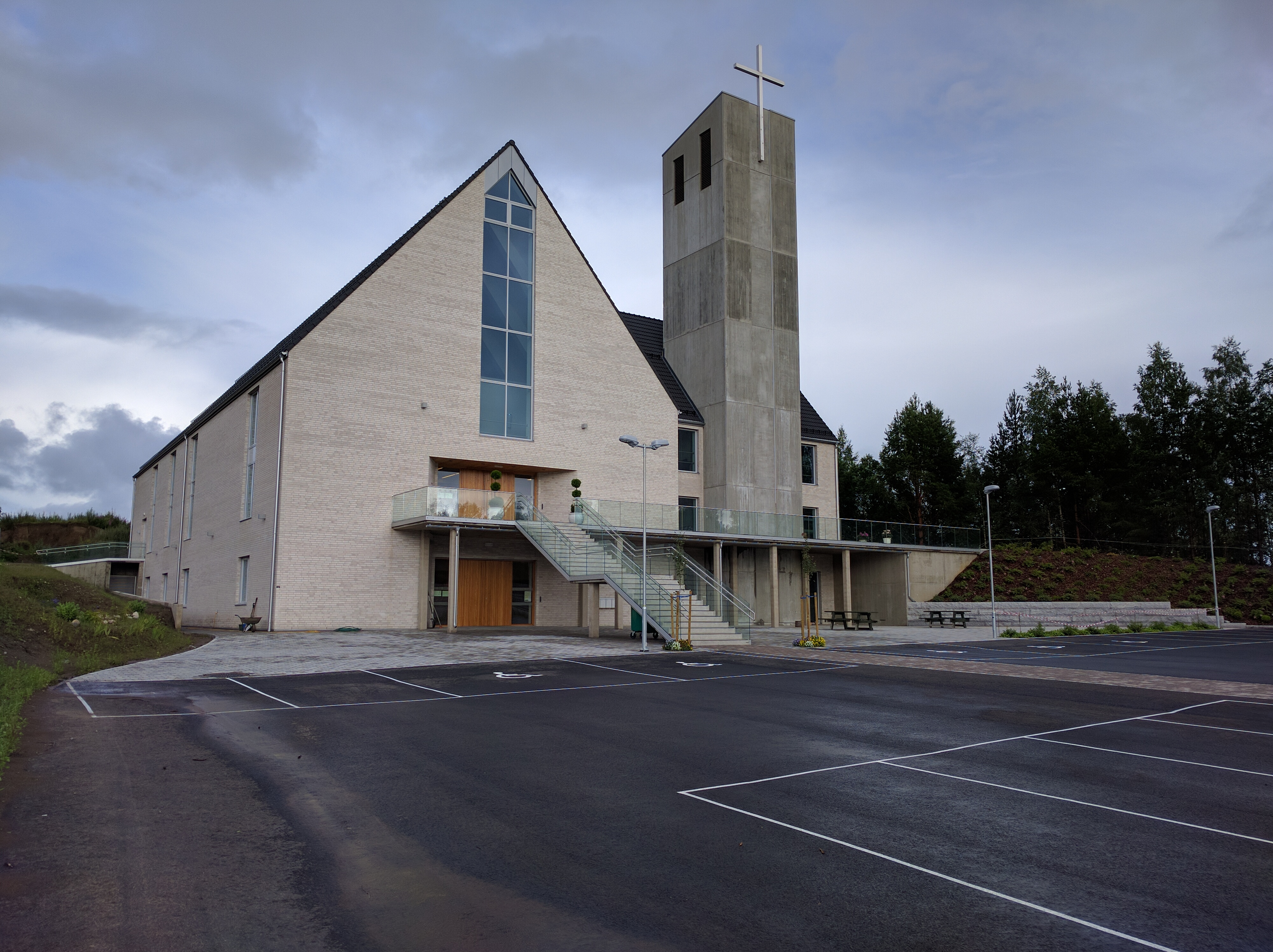
Saint Gudmund's Church, Jessheim

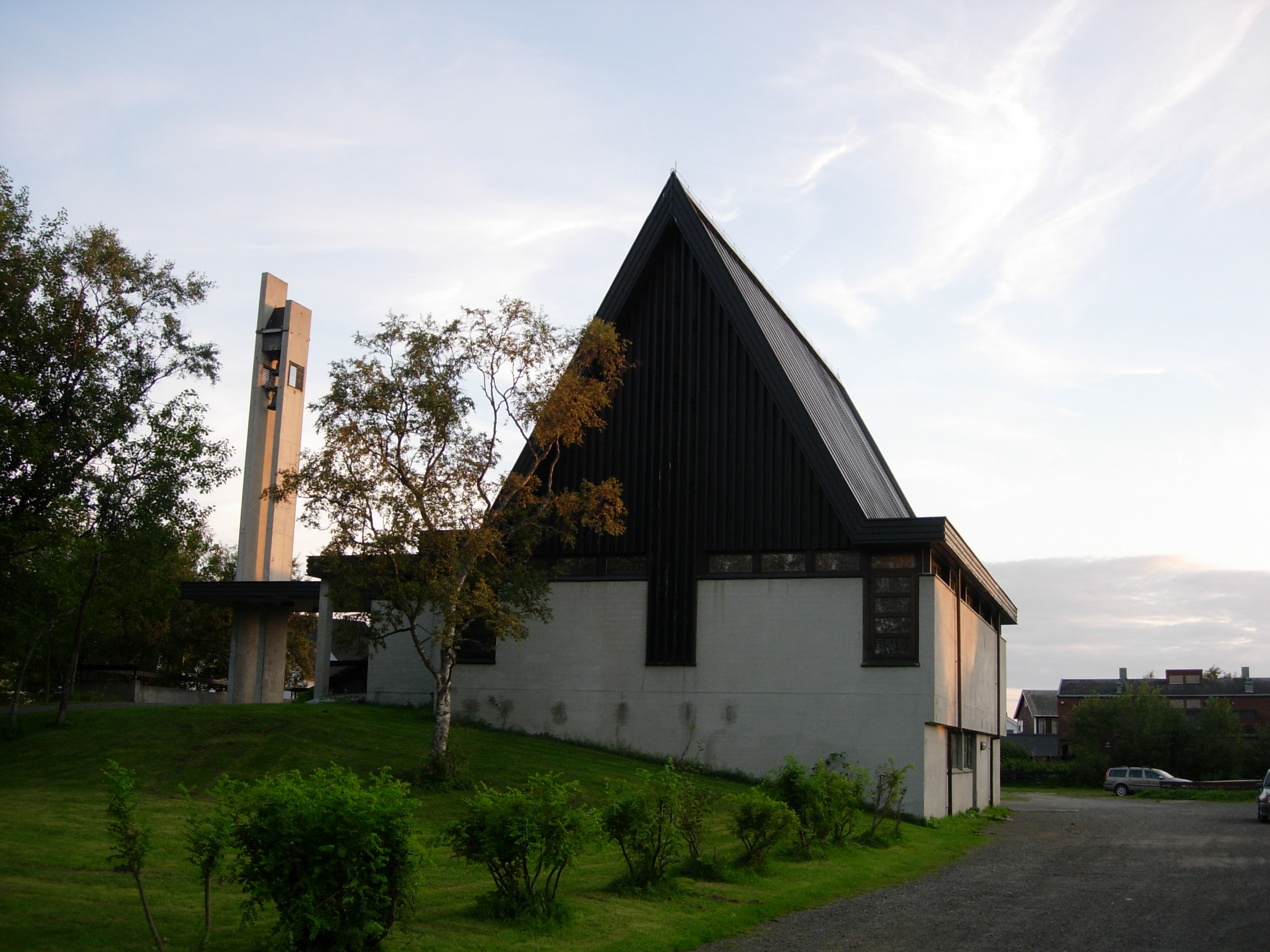
Saint Eystein`s Church, Bodø

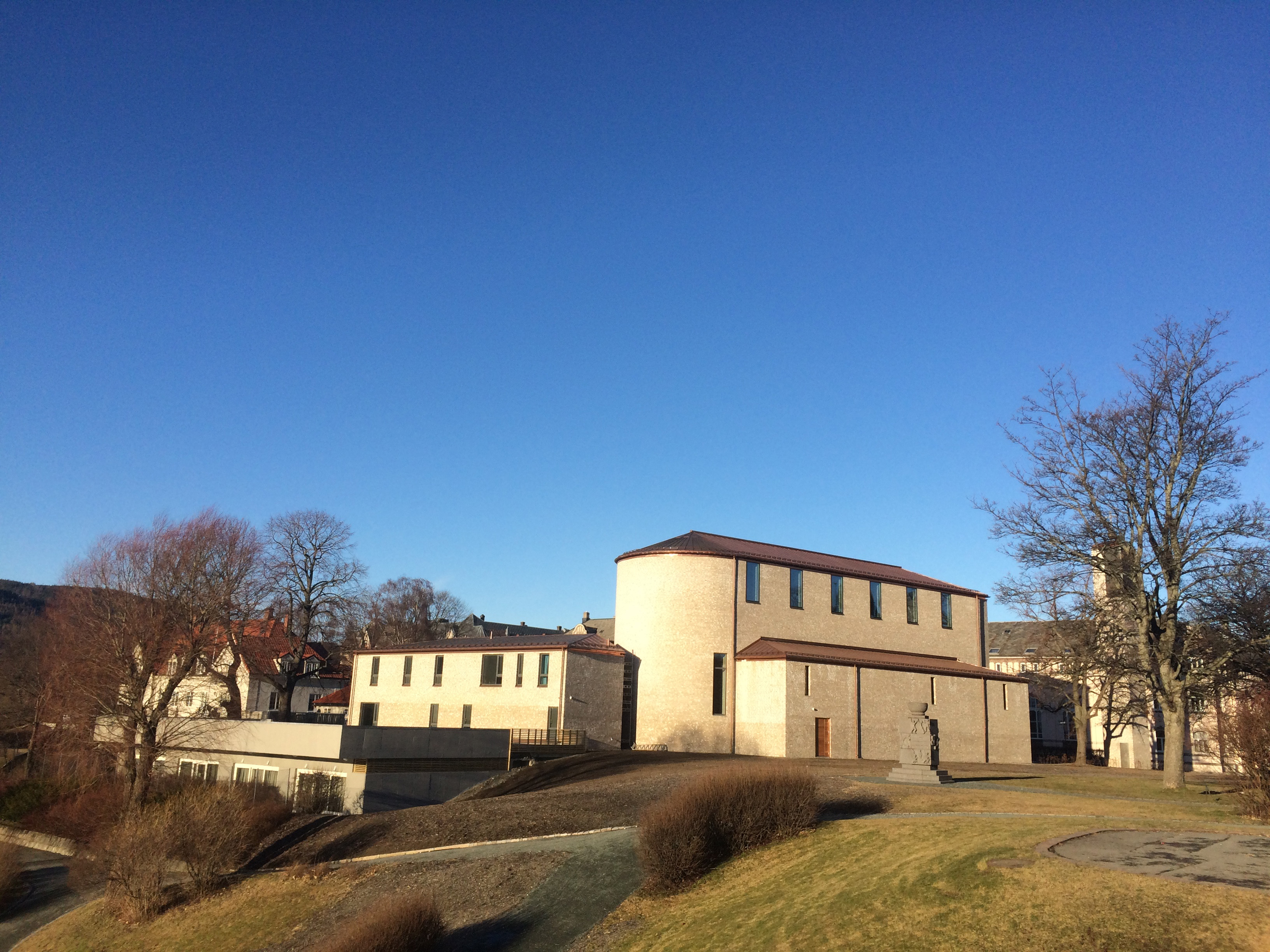
Saint Olaf's Cathedral, Trondheim

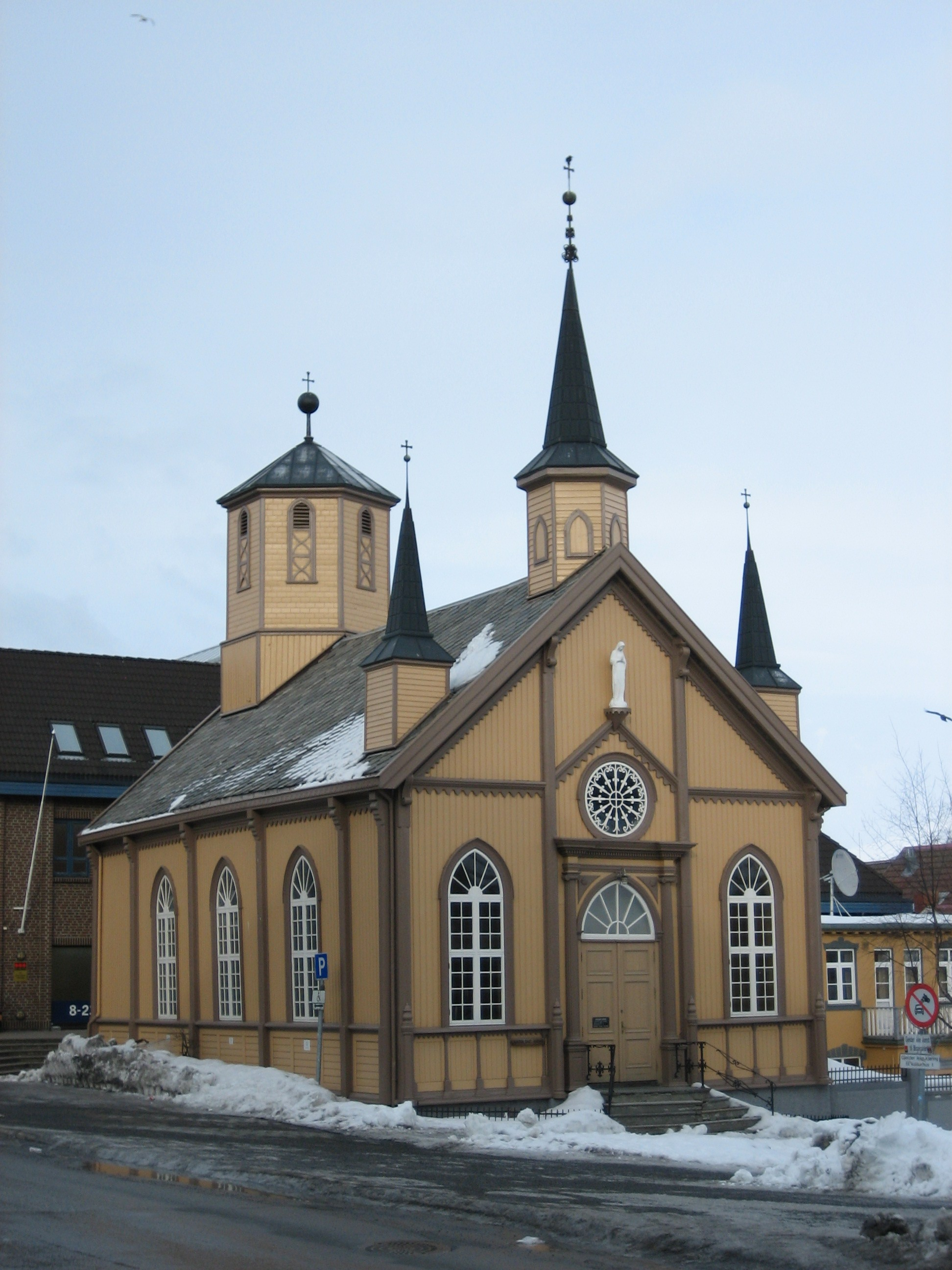
Our Lady's Cathedral, Tromsø

=== See also ===
- Religion in Norway
- Christianity in Norway
- Eastern Orthodoxy in Norway
- Protestantism in Norway
- List of Christian monasteries in Norway
- List of Catholic dioceses in Norway (Previous and present)

== Sources ==
- Official website of the Catholic Church of Norway, katolsk.no; accessed 21 September 2016. (in Norwegian)
- Kjelstrup, Karl (1943). Norvegia catholica: moderkirkens gjenreisning i Norge: et tilbakeblikk i anledning av 100-årsminnet for opprettelsen av St. Olavs menighet i Oslo, 1843–1943 (in Norwegian). Oslo: Oslo apostolic vicariate. p. 418.
- Brodersen, Øistein Grieve (1943). Norge-Rom, 1153-1953: Jubileumsskrift, 800 år siden opprettelsen av Den norske kirkeprovins (in Norwegian). Trondheim. p. 49.
