= Saint John the Baptist's Church, Sandefjord =

Saint John the Baptist's Church
- St. Johannes Døperen kirke
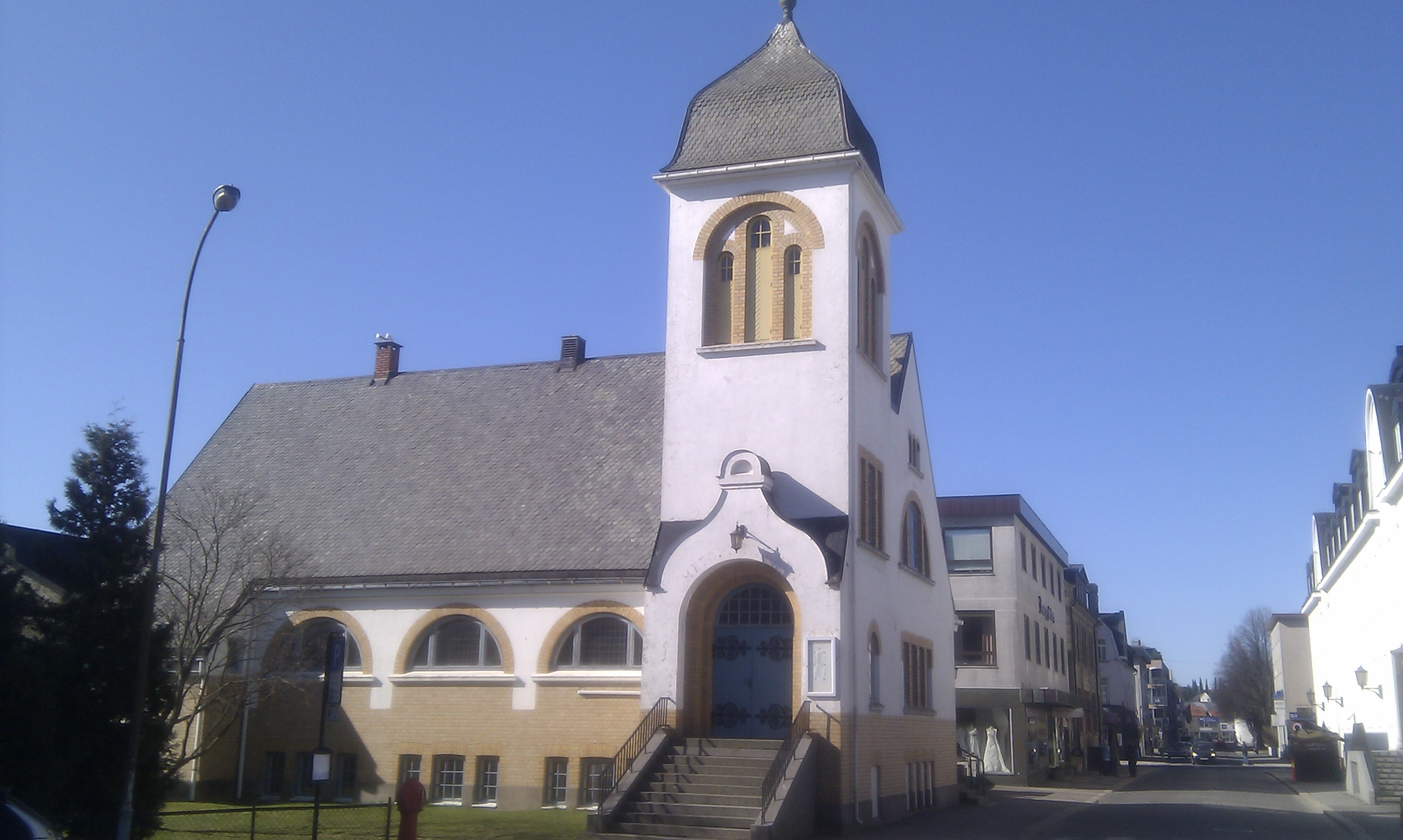
- Saint John the Baptist's Church
- 59°07′58″N 10°13′30″E
- Location: Sandefjord
- Country: Norway
- Denomination: Roman Catholic Church

The Saint John the Baptist's Church (Norwegian: St. Johannes Døperen kirke) is the name given to a religious building of the Catholic Church, which functions as the parish church in Sandefjord, Norway.

The building was built between 1916 and 1918 in the Art Nouveau style for the Methodists and was inaugurated on 5 March 1918. The church building served as a Protestant parish for the Methodists in the city for 90 years, but was sold to the Catholic Church in 2008. The building has a built surface of 235 m^{2} (2,530 sq ft) and has space for between 140 and 150 seats. On the ground floor there is also a hall for the parish on a plot of 652 m^{2} (7,020 sq ft).

== See also ==
- Roman Catholicism in Norway
- Roman Catholic Diocese of Oslo
