= Danish Church in Southern Schleswig =

- Dansk Kirke i Sydslesvig
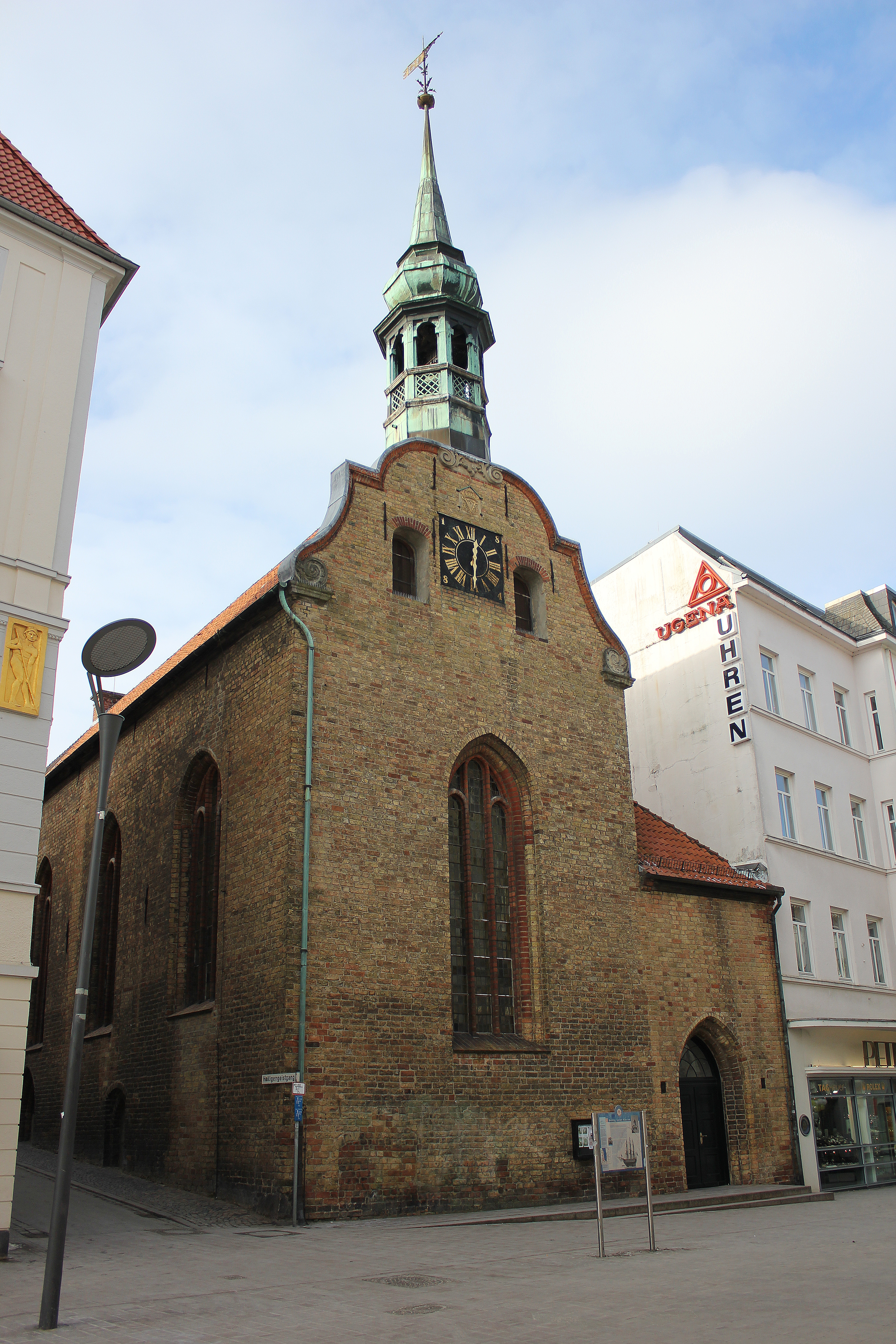
- Church of the Holy Spirit (Danish: Helligåndskirken) in Flensburg
- Abbreviation: DKS
- Classification: Protestant
- Orientation: Lutheran
- Region: Southern Schleswig
- Language: Danish
- Headquarters: Flensburg
- Branched from: Church of Denmark
- Congregations: c. 30
- Members: c. 6,000
- Official website: www.dks-folkekirken.dk

The Danish Church in Southern Schleswig (Danish: Dansk Kirke i Sydslesvig) is an evangelical Lutheran church in Southern Schleswig in Northern Germany.

The church was founded by the Danish minority of Southern Schleswig and is affiliated with the Danish Church Abroad and the Church of Denmark. Though the church operates independently, it is overseen by the bishop of the Diocese of Haderslev. As such, it shares many of the Church of Denmark's liberal views, including its support for the ordination of women and of remarriage after divorce.

Today, the church has nearly 30 congregations across Southern Schleswig and approximately 6,000 registered members who are serviced at 62 individual places of worship. The central church is the Church of the Holy Spirit (Danish: Helligåndskirken) in Flensburg.

== History ==
Following the reformation, many pastors in Southern Schleswig performed services in Danish, though certain parts of the ceremony had to be performed in German by mandate of the German Church. In 1905, the "Church Society of Flensburg and the Surrounding Area" (Danish: Kirkeligt Samfund for Flensborg og Omegn) was established with the purpose of reaching congregations within the German Church whose primary language was Danish. The society was rejected by officials who felt the Danish minority should conform to German society and its language.

In 1921, following the 1920 Schleswig plebiscites, the Danish Church in Flensburg (Danish: Den Danske Menighed i Flensborg) was established as a free church. In the following years the church expanded to include the whole of Southern Schleswig, and in 1959 it was given its current name.

== Provosts ==
- Anton Westergaard-Jacobsen, 1950–1962
- Hans Kvist, 1962–1969
- Ingemann Christensen, 1970–1979
- Christian Benjamin Karstoft, 1979–1993
- Viggo Jacobsen, 1993–2018
- Hasse Neldeberg Jørgensen, 2019–present

== Churches ==
Incomplete list of churches within the Danish Church in Southern Schleswig:

- Ansgar Church
- Church of the Holy Spirit (Helligåndskirken)
- Haderslev Danish Church
- Husum Danish Church
- Jaruplund Danish Church
- Lyksborg Danish Church
- St. Hans Church
- St. Jørgen Church
- Tarp Danish Church
- Westerland Danish Church
