= Niels Jacobsen =

Niels Jacobsen (14 September 1865 - 31 January 1935) was a Danish architect and politician who worked primarily in Odense.

== Biography ==
Born in Aabenraa, Jacobsen was the son of shipbuilder Niels Jacobsen and Marie Kjaer. Jacobsen initially trained as a bricklayer. In September 1884, he began his studies at the Royal Danish Academy of Fine Arts in Copenhagen, where he studied under Hans Jørgen Holm. Graduating in 1890, he was subsequently employed by Johan Daniel Herholdt, Ferdinand Meldahl, and Martin Nyrop. He opened his own design studio in Odense in 1893. From 1894 to 1908, he taught at Odense Technical College, served on the Board of Directors 1909-25, and participated in architectural competitions as a judge. Jacobsen was a member of the Odense City Council 1909-25, and chairman from 1911. He was honored as a Knight of the Dannebrog. Jacobsen was in Italy in 1891. He exhibited at Charlottenborg Spring Exhibition in 1898, the World Exhibition in Paris in 1900, the City Hall exhibition in Copenhagen in 1901, as well as the Kunstgewerbemuseum Berlin in 1910.

On August 11, 1893, he married Christiane Sophie Magdalene Bertram Petersen Møller (born 1872, Gråsten). He died in 1935 and is buried in Odense.

== Selected works ==
=== Odense ===
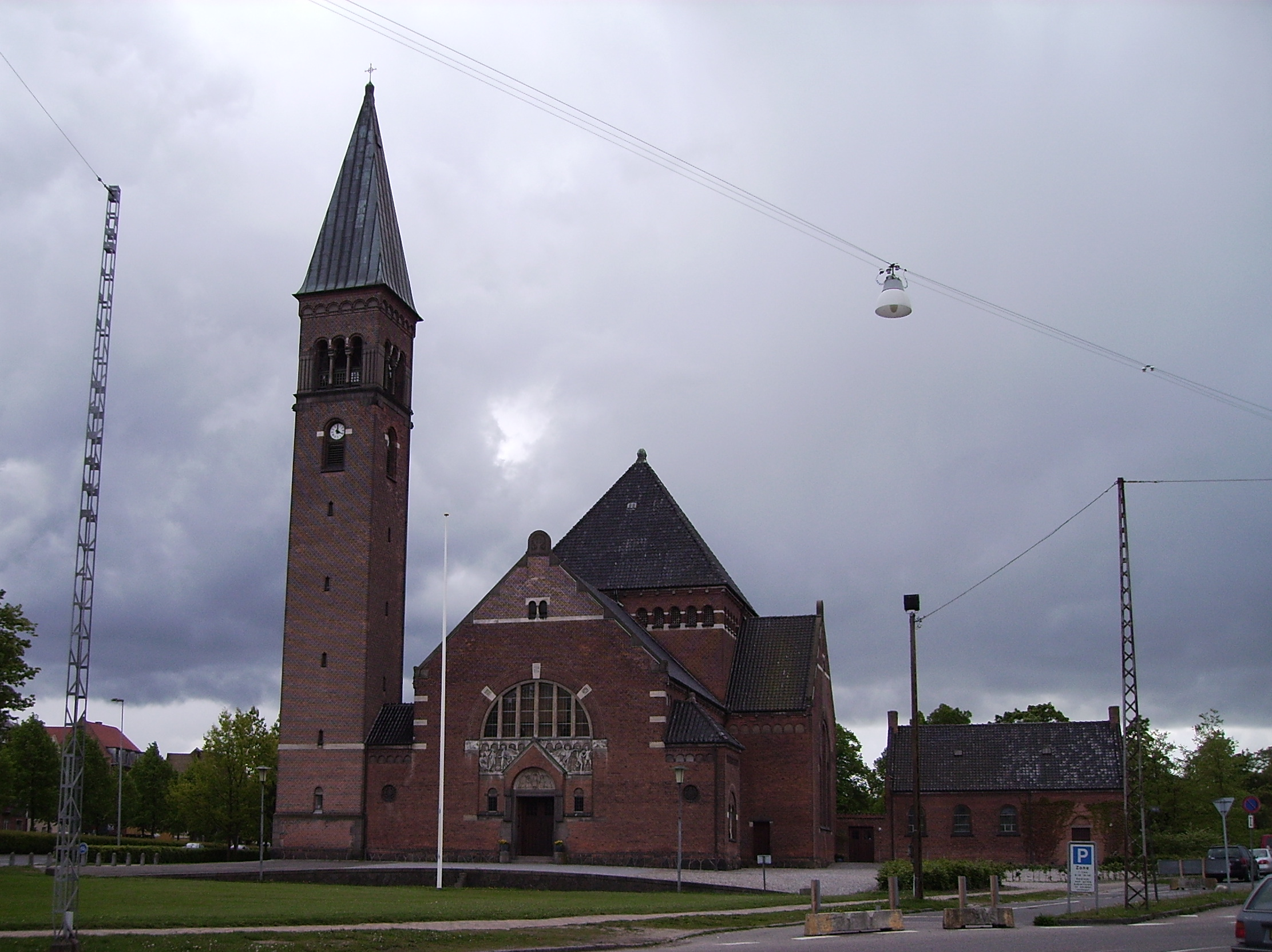
Ansgars Church

- Grand Hotel, Jernbanegade 18 (1896–97, extended 1911 by Jacobsen)
- Telephone exchange, Jernbanegade 16 (1897)
- Extension of Funen Art Museum, Jernbanegade 13 (1897–98)
- Odense Technical College, Hunderupvej 15 (1898, 1921)
- Fyens Forsamlinghus, Kongensgade 64-68 (1900, 1910)
- Handelsbanken, Vestergade 12-14 (1900, partially preserved)
- Ansgars Church (1902)
- Restoration of Sankt Hans Rectory, Odense (1906)
- Fyns Tidenes building, Fisketorvet (1907)
- Electricity Power Station, Klosterbakken (the original part 1908)
- University Society Building, Slotsvæget (1909)
- Gråbrødreplads 6-7 (1910–11)
- Odense Vinkompagni, Klostervej 5-13 (1911–12, 1917)
- Odense Theatre, Jernbanegade 21 (1913–14)
- PC Rasmussen's Department Store, Vestergade 16 (1914)
- Bispegården, Klaregade 17 (1916)
- Det Borgerlige Byggeselskab, tradesman field (1917)
- Foundation Eilschous Boliger, Lahnsgade (1919–20)
- Odense Courthouse, Albanigade 28 (1919–21)
- Expansion of the Odense County and City Hospotal (1926–28);
- Hans Christian Andersen Museum (1929–30)

=== Elsewhere ===
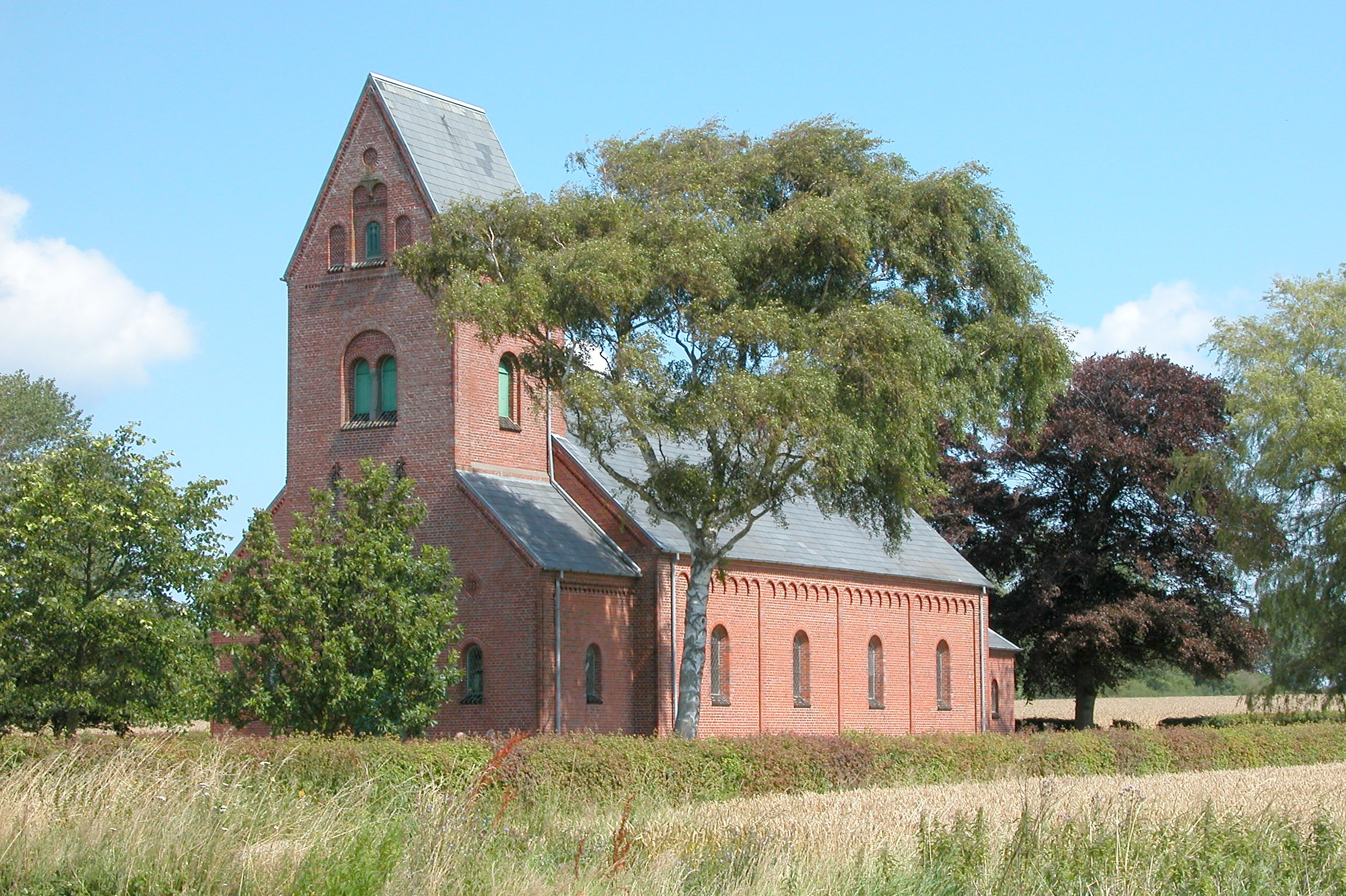
Ommel Church

- Ommel Church, Æro (1892–94)
- Chapel in Glorup Park (limestone, 1898)
- St. George Church near Aabenraa (1903–04)
- Nordslesvigske Folkebank, Aabenraa (1911–12)
- Tower of Marstal Church (1920)
