= Ansgars Church =

Church in Odense, Denmark

Coordinates: 55.3914°N 10.3783°E

- Ansgars Kirke
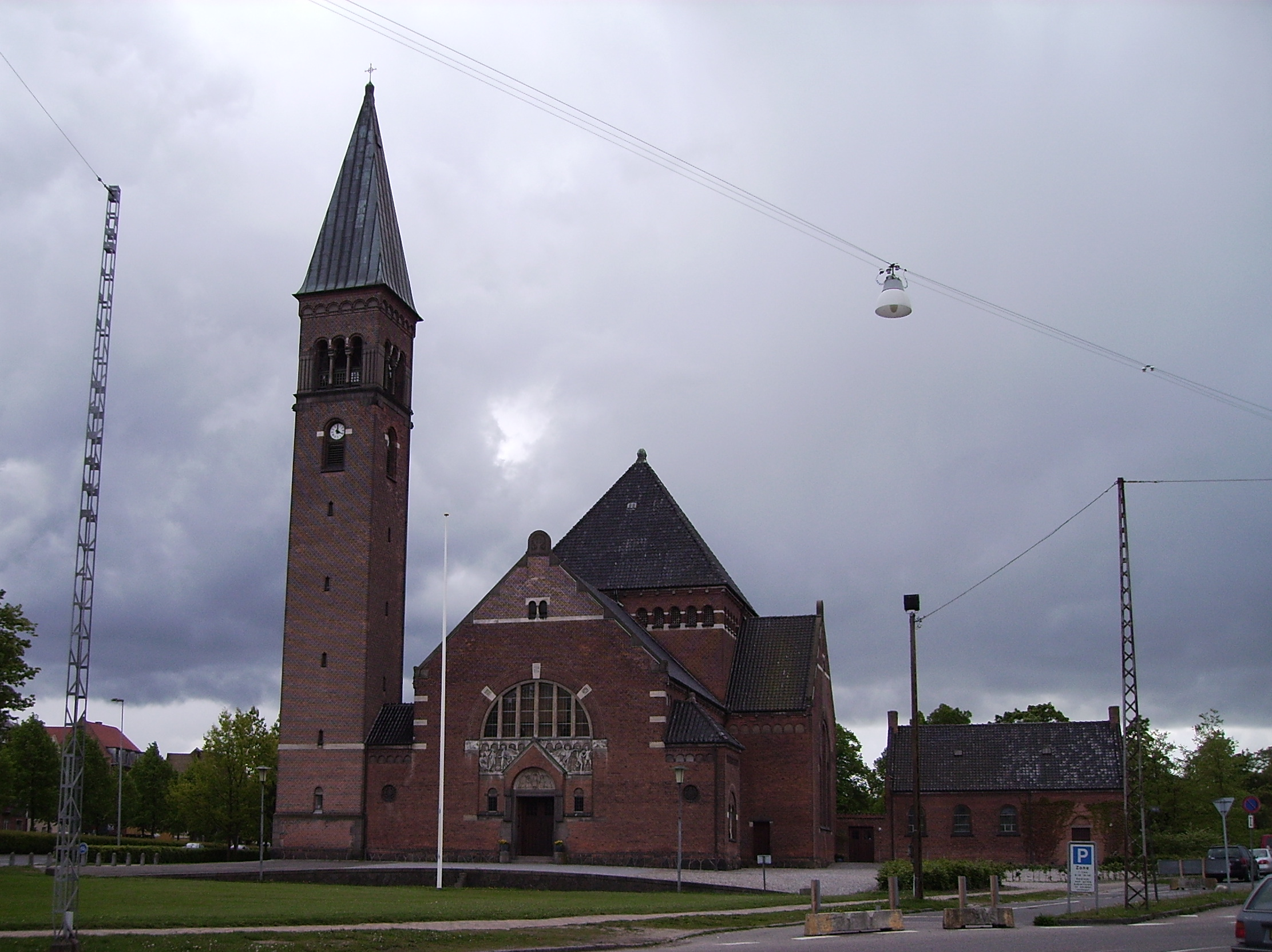
- Ansgars Church
- Denomination: Church of Denmark
- Website: https://www.ansgarskirke.dk/

Architecture
- Architect: Niels Jacobsen
- Completed: 1902

Administration
- Diocese: Diocese of Funen
- Deanery: Odense Sankt Knuds Provsti
- Parish: Ansgars Sogn

Ansgars Church (Danish: Ansgars Kirke) is a church in Odense, Denmark, within the Diocese of Funen.

Completed in 1902, it was the first church built in the city since the Middle Ages. The church was designed by Niels Jacobsen in a late Romanesque style from red brick, and built on granite foundation. Its features include a cross-shaped interior and a spired bell-tower measuring 45 metres (148 ft). There are three mural paintings inside the church: the 1902 work is a decoration on vault rubs, the 1917 frescoes are in the parish hall, and the 1935–1936 frescoes on the altar's niche.

The small park at the outskirts of Odense, belonging to the Ansgar Church has the grove known as Fruens Bøge (beeches of the Virgin).
