= Saint Paul's Catholic Church, Bergen =

Church in Bergen, Vestland, Norway

Coordinates: 60°23′21″N 5°19′25″E

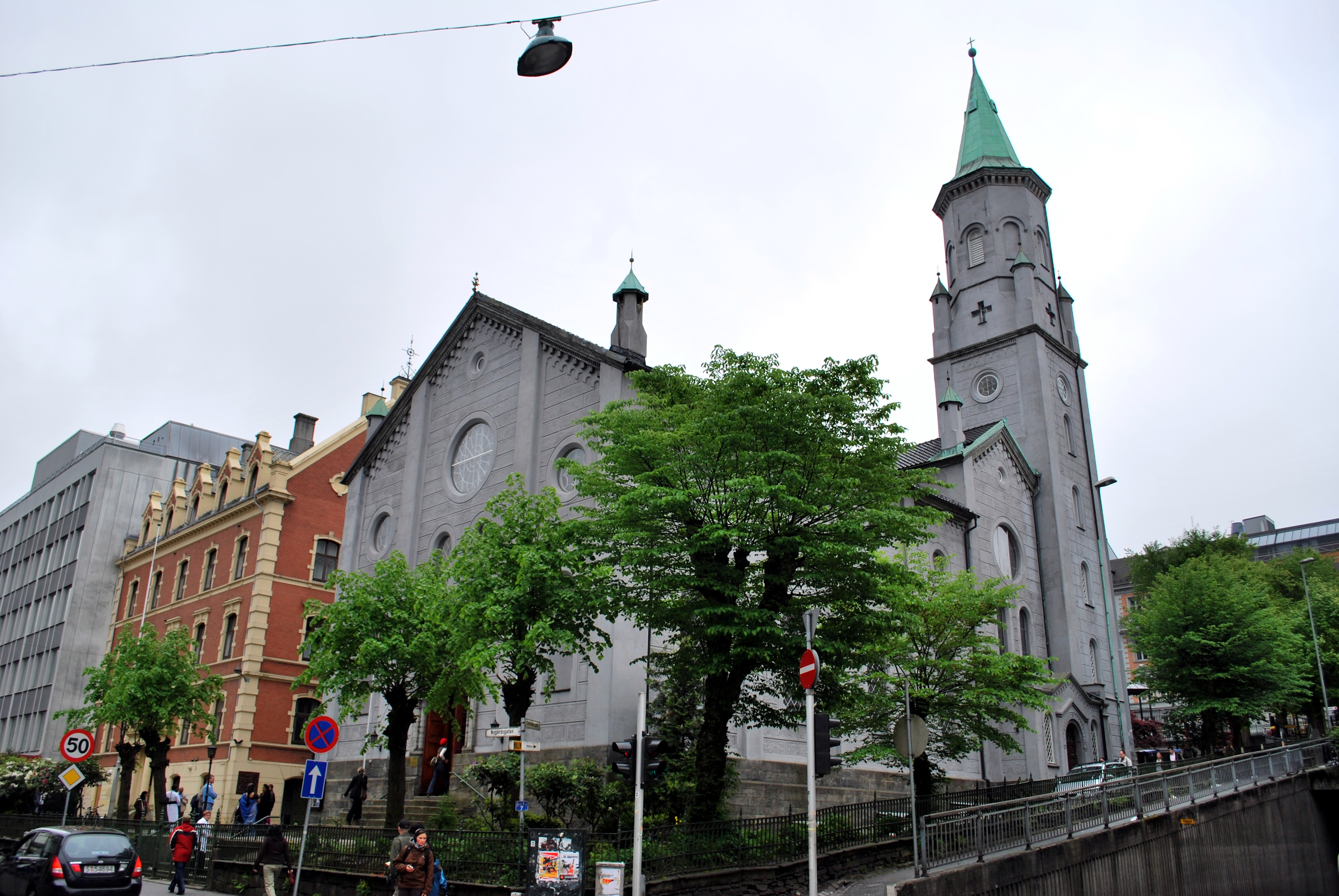
Saint Paul's Catholic Church and school

Saint Paul's Catholic Church (Norwegian: Sankt Paul katolske kirke) is a Roman Catholic church in Bergen, Norway. It is located at Christies street and Nygård street between Lille Lungegårdsvann and Nygårdshøyden.

Bergen Catholic parish includes Hordaland (excluding Sunnhordland) and Sogn og Fjordane, and was created in 1858, but the church did not come until 1870. On 31 December 2004 there were 4,044 registered Catholics in Bergen. 5 years later, the number increased to 7,300 believers. Furthermore, it grew to more than 12,000 in 2012. There is also a Roman Catholic school in Bergen, St. Paul's School. 60% of the students at this school are Catholics.

For the 12,000 Catholics in Bergen, St. Paul's Catholic Church seems too small to accommodate all of them. There is also St. James's Church to serve the growing community, but there are still plans to build several Catholic churches in Bergen. The largest groups of Catholics in Bergen are Polish and Chileans.

== See also ==
- Roman Catholicism in Norway
- Roman Catholic Diocese of Oslo
- List of Roman Catholic parishes in Norway
