= Ansgar Church =

Coordinates: 54.80232°N 9.42393°E

- Ansgarkirche
- Ansgar Kirke
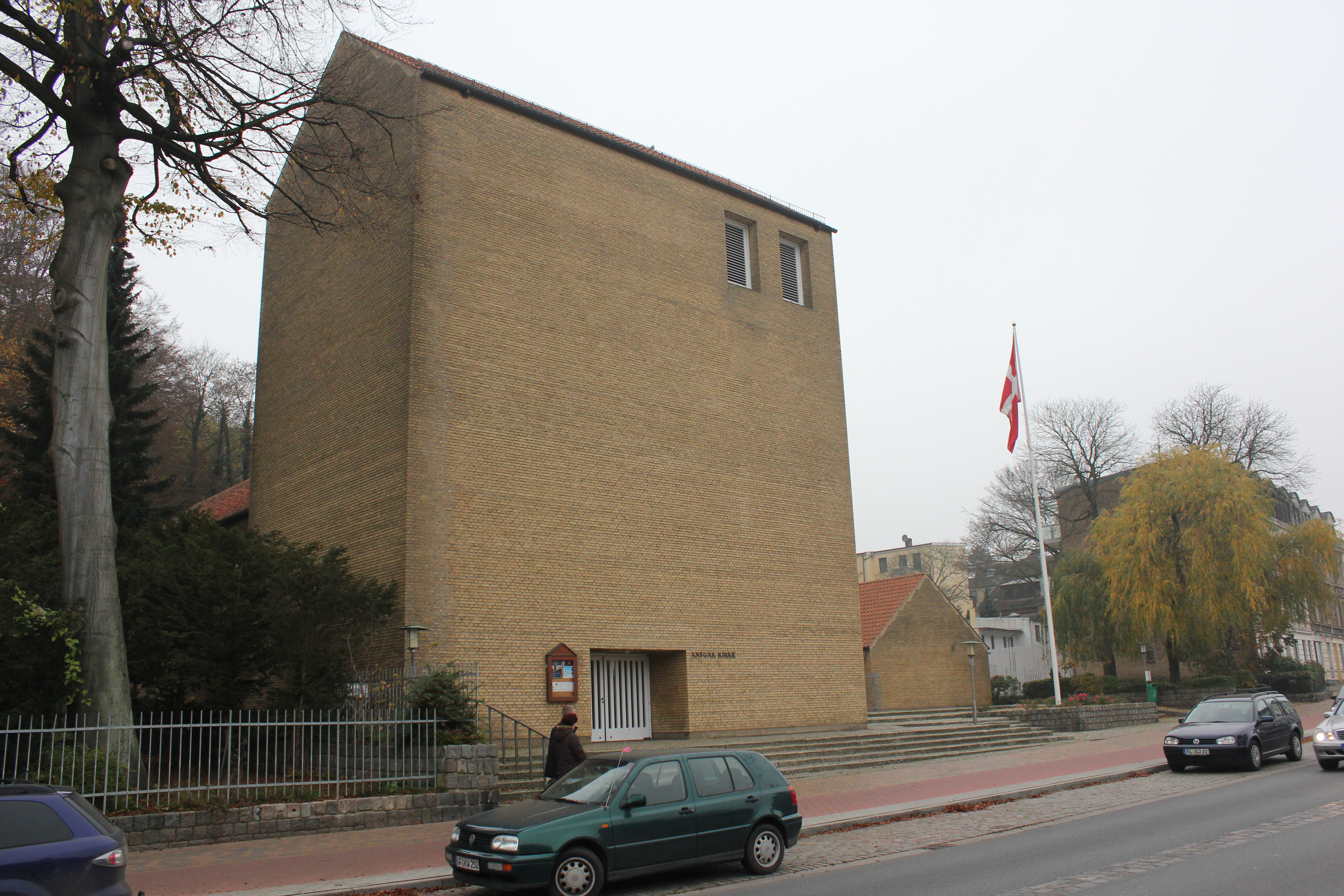
- Ansgar Church
- Location: Apenrader Str. 25 Flensburg, Germany
- Website: https://www.dks-folkekirken.dk/sogne/ansgar-flensborg-nord/

History
- Dedicated: November 3, 1968

Architecture
- Architect: Kay Fisker Robert Duelund Mortensen Svend Høgsbroe

Administration
- Diocese: Diocese of Haderslev
- Deanery: Danish Church in Southern Schleswig

Clergy
- Pastor: Merethe Neldeberg Jørgensen

Ansgar Church (Danish: Ansgar Kirke, German: Ansgarkirche) is an evangelical lutheran church in northern Flensburg, Germany. Its congregation is the largest within the Danish Church in Southern Schleswig. The church is named after Saint Ansgar.

== Building ==
The creation of a new church in northern Flensburg was first proposed in 1949 by Martin Nørgaard, a pastor originally from Handewitt. Because of difficulty raising funds, the grounds were not purchased by the church until 1962. Construction of the church and its community hall were funded by a donation from A.P. Møller and his wife Chastine Mckinney Møller.

The building was modeled, in part, after Notmark Kirke, a church on the Danish island of Als. It was designed by the architect Kay Fisker, who died before construction began. After Fisker's death, the project was completed by architects Robert Duelund Mortensen and Svend Høgsbroe. Construction began in 1966, and was completed in November 1968.

As of January 5, 2007, the church has been placed under monument protection, and was remodeled in 2008.

== Congregation ==
The Flensburg North Congregation was established in 1948. The church has approximately 650 members, belonging to around 500 households. It remains the largest congregation within the Danish Church in Southern Schleswig.

== Pastors ==
- 1948–1951 Otto Marius Warncke
- 1951–1983 Martin Friedrich Nørgaard
- 1952–1959 Christian Overgaard
- 1959–1977 Martin Torodd Kontni
- 1978–1982 Bjarne Sandal
- 1982–1995 Per Østerbye
- 1996–2013 Sten Haarløv
- 2003–2016 Preben Kortnum Morgensen
- 2016–2018 Christina Theresia Frøkjær
- 2019–2025 Merethe Neldebjerg Jørgensen
- 2025–present Ruben Fønsbo
