= St. Ansgar's Church =

Church in Agder, Norway

- Sankt Ansgar kirke
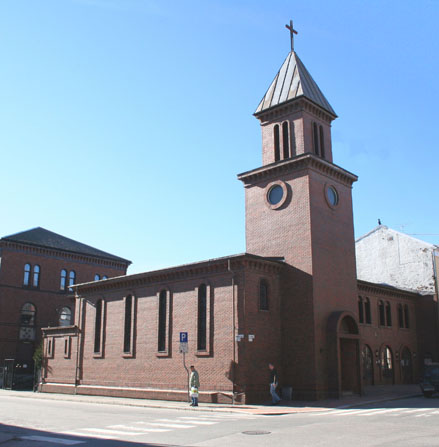
- St. Ansgar's Church
- 58.14469°N 07.99775°E
- Location: Kirkegata 3 Kristiansand, Kristiansand Municipality
- Country: Norway
- Denomination: Roman Catholic
- Website: St. Ansgar's Church (in Norwegian)

History
- Status: Parish Church
- Dedication: Saint Ansgar
- Consecrated: 1936, later affected by fire and rebuilt

Architecture
- Functional status: Active

Administration
- Diocese: Oslo
- Parish: St. Ansgar

Clergy
- Bishop: Bernt Ivar Eidsvig

St. Ansgar's Church is a parish church of the Roman Catholic Church in the town of Kristiansand in Kristiansand Municipality in Agder county, Norway. It is the only Roman Catholic church building in Agder county in Southern Norway.

The first church was built in 1936. The current church building is built of red bricks and expanded, after total restoration after the first, whitewashed church burned in the 1980s. In addition to church services in Norwegian, it has a Mass in English every Sunday afternoon at 6 p.m.

== History ==
In 1890, the Catholic church in Kristiansand was established and the German Wilhelm Hartmann from Münster was the first pastor. Just after the church's founding, the Sisters of St. Joseph came to town and bought a property next to the rectory. For nearly 100 years, they were an indispensable support for the fragile new church. During the reconstruction after the major town fire in 1892, they purchased several more properties, and established a Catholic hospital in the town, St Joseph's Hospital, which operated until 1967.

The first church was built in 1935 and was consecrated in 1936. The current church was built and expanded on the same plot.

Initially, the growing of number of church members was slow. However, the situation is completely different today, because the church is experiencing a strong growth, mainly because the relocation of Catholics of foreign origin have risen sharply.
