= Ansgar's Church =

- Ansgariikyrkan
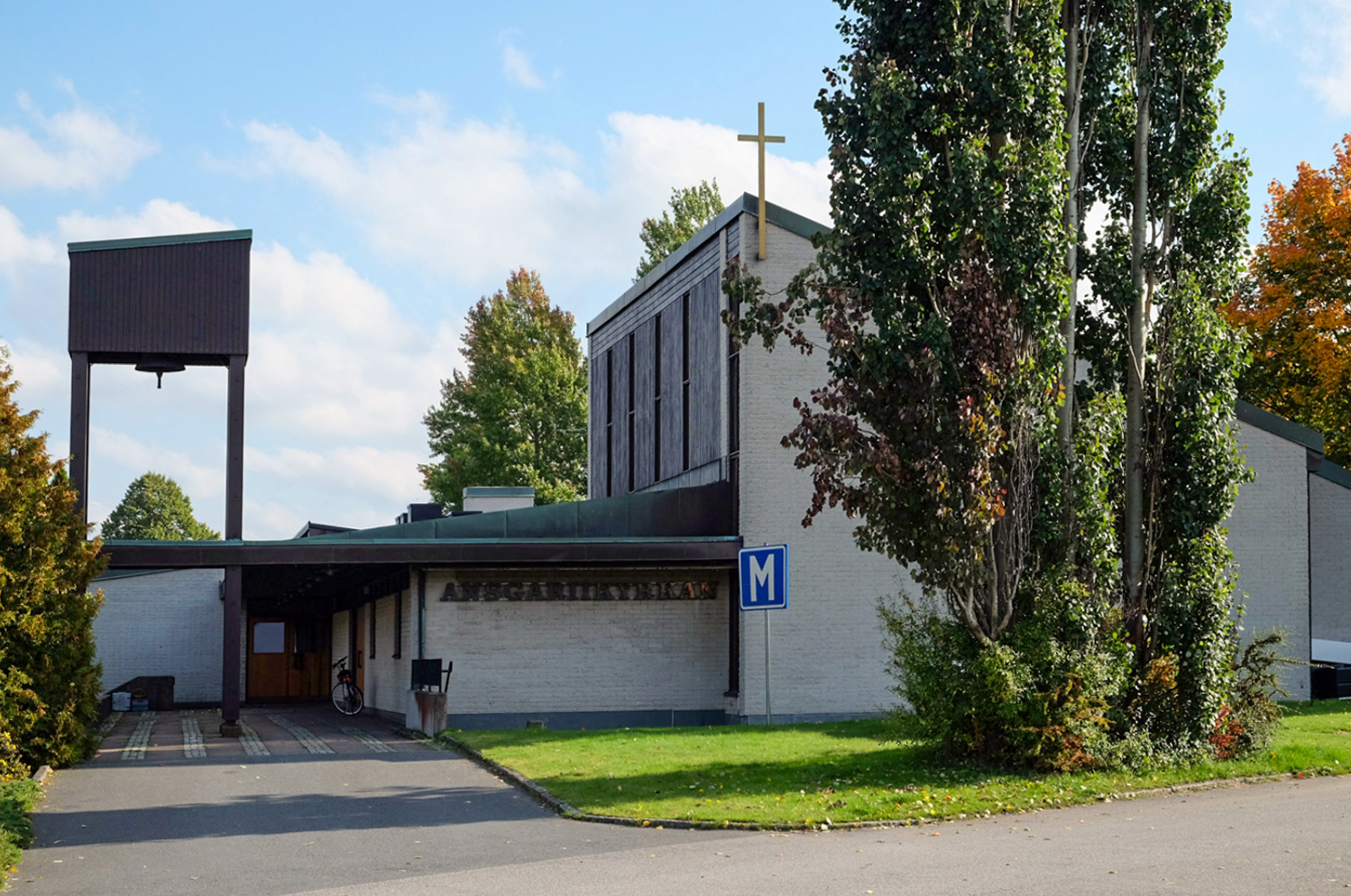
- Ansgar's Church in September 2017

- Location within Jönköping Location within Sweden
- Ansgar's Church
- 57°47′16″N 14°14′17″E
- Location: Jönköping
- Country: Sweden
- Denomination: Uniting Church in Sweden
- Previous denomination: Mission Covenant Church of Sweden

History
- Consecrated: 17 October 1965

Administration
- Parish: Ansgar

The Ansgar's Church (Swedish: Ansgariikyrkan) was a church building in Vättersnäs in Jönköping, Sweden. It belonged to Mission Covenant Church of Sweden, which in October 2012 joined the Uniting Church in Sweden.

It was inaugurated on 17 October 1965. On the night before Tuesday, 3 August 2021, the church was destroyed by a fire.

According to a police report published on 12 August the same year, the fire was caused following a lightning strike. This conclusion has later been questioned, as no thunder was recorded by the SMHI, and because of witnesses of firework explosions.
