= St. Svithun's Church (Stavanger) =

St. Swithun's Church
- Sankt Svithun kirke
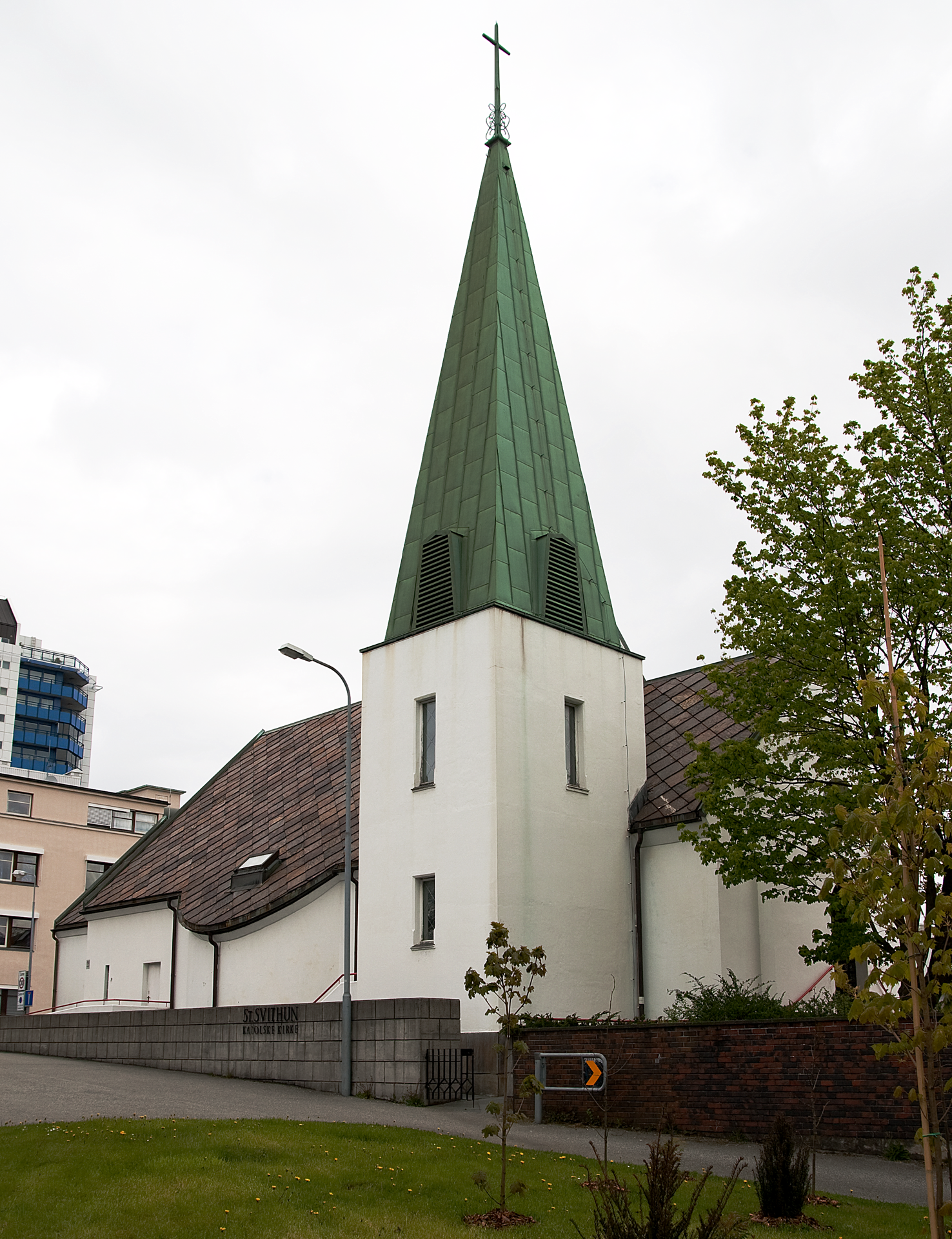
- St. Swithun's Church
- 58°57′57.082″N 5°43′46.776″E
- Location: St. Svithuns gt. 8 Stavanger
- Country: Norway
- Denomination: Roman Catholic
- Website: St Swithun's Church (in Norwegian)

History
- Status: Parish Church
- Dedication: Saint Swithun
- Consecrated: 1983

Architecture
- Functional status: Active
- Architect(s): Thomas Thiis-Evensen; Grete Stuen

Administration
- Diocese: Oslo
- Parish: St Svithun

Clergy
- Bishop: Bernt Ivar Eidsvig

St Svithun's Church (or St Swithun's Church, Norwegian: Sankt Svithun kirke) is the parish church of the Roman Catholic Church in Stavanger, Norway. The church is dedicated to St Swithun of Winchester. St Swithun is the Patron saint of Stavanger, and the Stavanger Cathedral of the Church of Norway, built in 1125, was dedicated to St. Svithun, centuries before the Protestant Reformation. The first Catholic church in Stavanger after the Reformation was consecrated in 1898.

The current postmodern church was designed by architect Thomas Thiis-Evensen, and built in 1983. The congregation moved to the larger, current church. The church has increased sharply over the last 40 years due to increased immigration in relation to the oil industry and the NATO center, and due to increased immigration from Catholic countries. The strong growth in membership over the past 20 years led to a wish to extend the current church in addition to start with several other booth locations. Already in 1996, the congregation started planning an expansion of the church, and expansion of the church building until nearly 600 seats was completed in 2012 as a continuation of the existing church idiom. In 2023 the parish celebrated its 125 year anniversary with a mass in St. Svithun's Church and a large party at Hetlandshallen.
