= Religion in Norway =

Religions in Norway (31 December 2019)
1. Evangelical Lutheran Church of Norway (68.7%)
2. Catholic Church (3.08%)
3. Pentecostal congregations (0.76%)
4. Eastern Orthodox and Oriental Orthodox (0.53%)
5. Evangelical Lutheran Free Church (0.36%)
6. Other Christian denominations (2.21%)
7. Islam (3.41%)
8. Buddhism (0.40%)
9. Hinduism (0.21%)
10. Secular humanism (1.85%)
11. Other religion (0.09%)
12. Unaffiliated (18.3%)

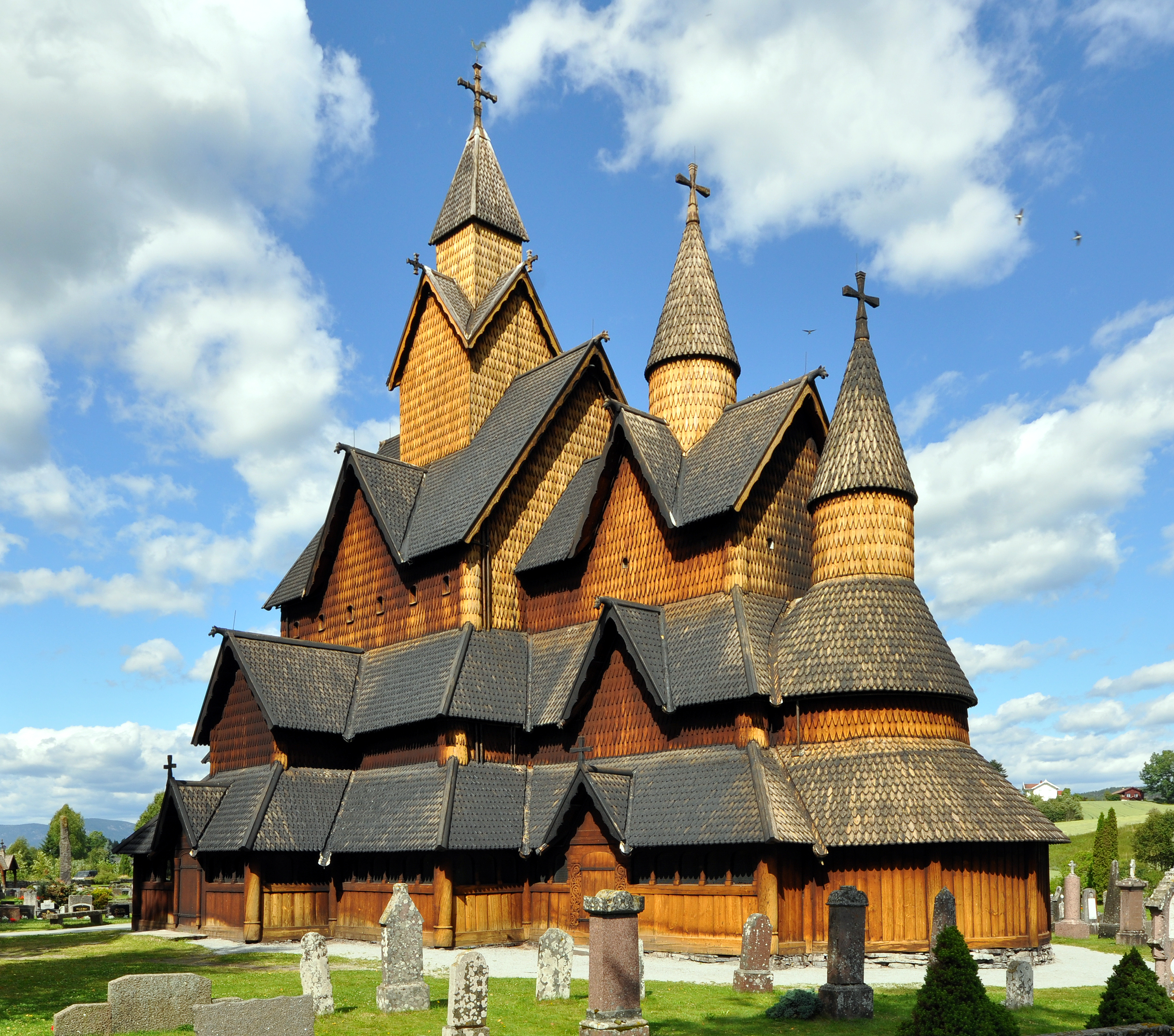
The Heddal Stave Church in Notodden Municipality, the largest stave church in Norway.

Religion in Norway is dominated by Lutheran Christianity, with 61.7% of the population belonging to the Evangelical Lutheran Church of Norway in 2024.

The Catholic Church is the next largest Christian church at 3.1% (status 2019). The growing group of unaffiliated made up 18.3% of the population in 2019. Islam is followed by 3.4% of the population (2019).

A bill passed in 2016 and effective as of 1 January 2017 created the Church of Norway as an independent legal entity. Until the 2012 constitutional amendment Lutheranism was the state religion of the country. The Church of Norway will still obtain financial support from the state of Norway, along with other religious communities.

Early Norwegians, like most Scandinavians, were once adherents of Norse paganism; the Sámi having a shamanistic religion. Norway was gradually Christianized by Christian missionaries between 1000 and 1150. Before the Protestant Reformation in 1536/1537, Norwegians were part of the Catholic Church.

== Demographics ==
In Norway as of 2019, 68.7% of the population are members of the Evangelical Lutheran Church as compared to 96% in the 1960s. As of 2024, 61.7% of the population belonged to the Evangelical Lutheran Church of Norway.

A 1997 global study of freedom of religion states that "Most members of the state church are not active adherents, except for the rituals of birth, confirmation, weddings, and burials. Some 3 per cent on average attend church on Sunday and 10 per cent on average attend church every month."

Other religious groups operate freely and people are also free not to be affiliated with any religion or life stance. Approximately 18.3% are not members of any official religious or philosophical communities, while about 13.0% of the population are members of other religious or philosophical communities outside the Church of Norway. Catholics and Muslims are each about 3% of the population and have been rising in numbers in recent years. About 1.8% of the population lists the Norwegian Humanist Association as a life stance instead of a religion. Orthodox, Jews, Hindus, Buddhists and Sikhs are present in very small numbers, together comprising about 1 percent of the population.

However officially belonging to a religion does not necessarily reflect actual religious beliefs and practices. In 2005, a survey conducted in sixty-five countries indicated that Norway was the least religious country in Western Europe, with 29% counting themselves as believing in a church or deity, 26% as being atheists, and 45% not being entirely certain.

According to the Eurobarometer Poll of 2010:-

- 22% of Norwegian citizens responded that "they believe there is a God".
- 44% responded that "they believe there is some sort of spirit or life force".
- 29% responded that "they don't believe there is any sort of spirit, God or life force".
- 5% gave no response.

According to 2016 data from annual social-cultural study Norwegian Monitor (Norsk Monitor), 39 percent of Norwegians responded with "No" to the question "Do you believe in God?", while 37 percent said "Yes" and 27 percent said that they did not know. The survey also showed that women are more likely to believe in God than men and that faith in God is stronger among the old than the young.

In a 2018 European Values Study 47.1% of the Norwegian population answered "Yes" to the question "Do you believe in God?" as opposed to the 52.9% that answered "No". The country ranked fourth among the 30 countries surveyed.

According to Pew Research Centre (2018) for Norway:

- 19% 'Believe in God, absolutely certain'
- 19% 'Believe in God, fairly certain'
- 11% 'Believe in God, less certain'
- 47% 'Do not Believe in God'

The same report also noted further specifics:

- 20% 'Believe in God as described in the Bible'
- 38% 'Believe in other higher power or spiritual force'
- 33% 'Do not believe in any higher power'

=== Census ===
Religion (on 31 December 2019)	Members	Percent	Growth (2014–2019)
Christianity	4,059,366	75.63%	-2.0
Church of Norway	3,686,715	68.68%	−4.1%
Catholic Church	165,254	3.08%	72.8%
Pentecostal congregations	40,725	0.76%	4.0%
Eastern Orthodox Church and Oriental Orthodox Church	28,544	0.53%	63.3%
Evangelical Lutheran Free Church	19,313	0.36%	−1.0%
Jehovah's Witnesses	12,661	0.24%	2.9%
Baptists	10,823	0.20%	5.1%
The Methodist Church in Norway	10,000	0.19%	−5.4%
Other Christianity	85,331	1.59%	−6.8%
Non-Christian religions	225,138	4.19%	29.2%
Islam	182,826	3.41%	29.6%
Buddhism	21,555	0.40%	19.9%
Hinduism	12,153	0.23%	48.6%
Sikhism	4,080	0.08%	19.0%
Baháʼí Faith	1,091	0.02%	−3.8%
Judaism	794	0.01%	6.3%
Other religions and life stances	2,639	0.05%	51.2%
Humanism	99,468	1.85%	12.8%
no affiliation	983,608	18.32%	28.9%
Total	5,367,580	100.0%	3.9%

== Religions ==
=== Christianity ===
The Norwegian flag is formed by the Nordic cross, symbol of Christianity.

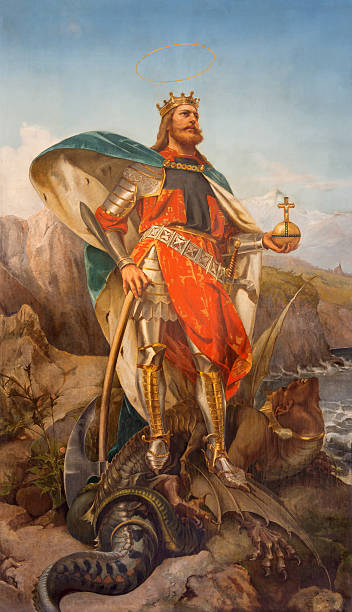
Saint Olaf, the patron saint and former king of the Kingdom of Norway.

==== From conversion to the Reformation ====
The conversion of Norway to Christianity began in the 1000s. The raids on the British isles and on the Frankish kingdoms had brought the Vikings in touch with Christianity. Haakon the Good of Norway, who had grown up in England, tried to introduce Christianity in the mid-10th century but had met resistance from pagan leaders and soon abandoned the idea.

Anglo-Saxon missionaries from England and Germany had tried to convert Norwegians to Christianity but only had limited success. However, they succeeded in converting Olaf I of Norway to Christianity. Olaf II of Norway (later Saint Olaf) had more success in his attempts to convert the population with many Norwegians converting in the process, and he is credited with Christianizing Norway.

The Christians in Norway often established churches or other holy sites at places that had previously been sacred under the Norse religion. The spread of conversion can be measured by burial sites as Pagans were buried with grave goods while Christians were not. Christianity had become well established in Norway by the middle of the 11th century and had become dominant by the middle of the 12th century. Stave churches were built of wood without the use of nails in the 13th century.

==== From the Reformation to the present ====
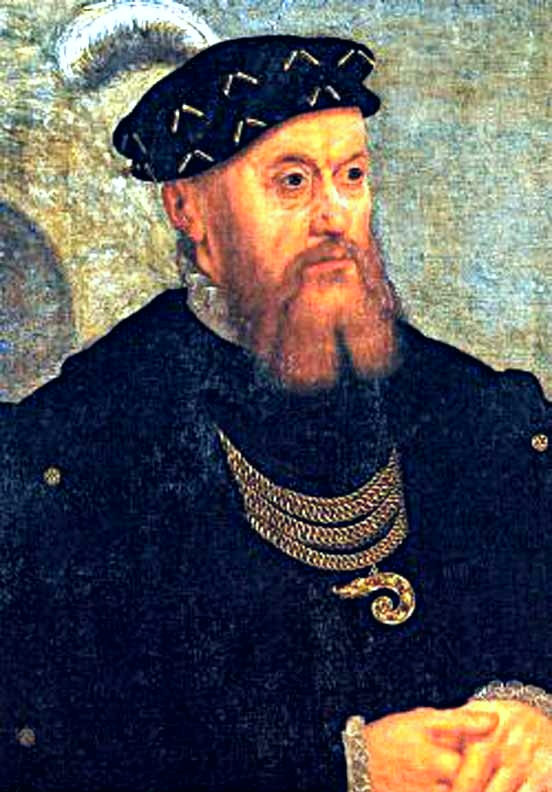
In 1536, King Christian III of Denmark converted the Norwegians from Catholicism to Lutheran Protestantism.

The Norwegians were Catholics until the Danish king Christian III of Denmark ordered Denmark to convert to Lutheranism in 1536 and, as Norway was then ruled by Denmark, the Norwegians converted as well. The Danish Church Ordinance was introduced in 1537 and a Norwegian Church Council officially adopted Lutheranism in 1539. Monasteries were dissolved and church property confiscated with the Evangelical Lutheran Church of Norway established and funded by the state. Bishops still adhering to Catholicism were deposed, with Olav, Archbishop of Nidaros, fleeing the country in 1537 and another bishop dying in prison in 1542. Catholicism held on in remote parts of Norway for another couple of decades, although eventually the remaining Catholics converted or fled, to the Netherlands in particular. Many pastors were replaced with Danes and Norwegian clergy being trained at the University of Copenhagen as Norway did not have a university. The Danish translation of the Bible was used as were Danish catechisms and hymns. The use of Danish in religious ceremonies had a strong influence on the development of the Norwegian language.

The church undertook a program to convert the Sámi in the 16th and 17th centuries with the program being largely successful. The University of Oslo was established in 1811 allowing priests to train in Norway. The Norwegian Constitution of 1814 did not grant religious freedom as it stated that Jews and Jesuits were denied entrance in Norway. Moreover, adherence to Lutheran Christianity was compulsory, and so was church attendance. A ban on lay preaching was lifted in 1842, allowing several free church movements and a strong lay movement being established in the Evangelical Lutheran Church. Three years later, the so-called Dissenter Law came into effect, allowing other Christian congregations to establish in Norway. Atheism became allowed as well, and the ban on Judaism was lifted in 1851. Monasticism and Jesuits were allowed, starting in 1897 and 1956 respectively.

The Norwegian Constitution was amended in 1964 allowing freedom of religion; the exceptions are the Norwegian royal family, who are required by the constitution to be Lutherans. Furthermore, at least one half of the government must belong to the state church. On 21 May 2012 the constitution was again amended to increase the autonomy of the Evangelical Lutheran Church and decrease the connection to the state.

Church pastors were active in the Norwegian resistance movement during World War II. The state church was also active in the moral debate which arose in the 1950s.

=== Islam ===
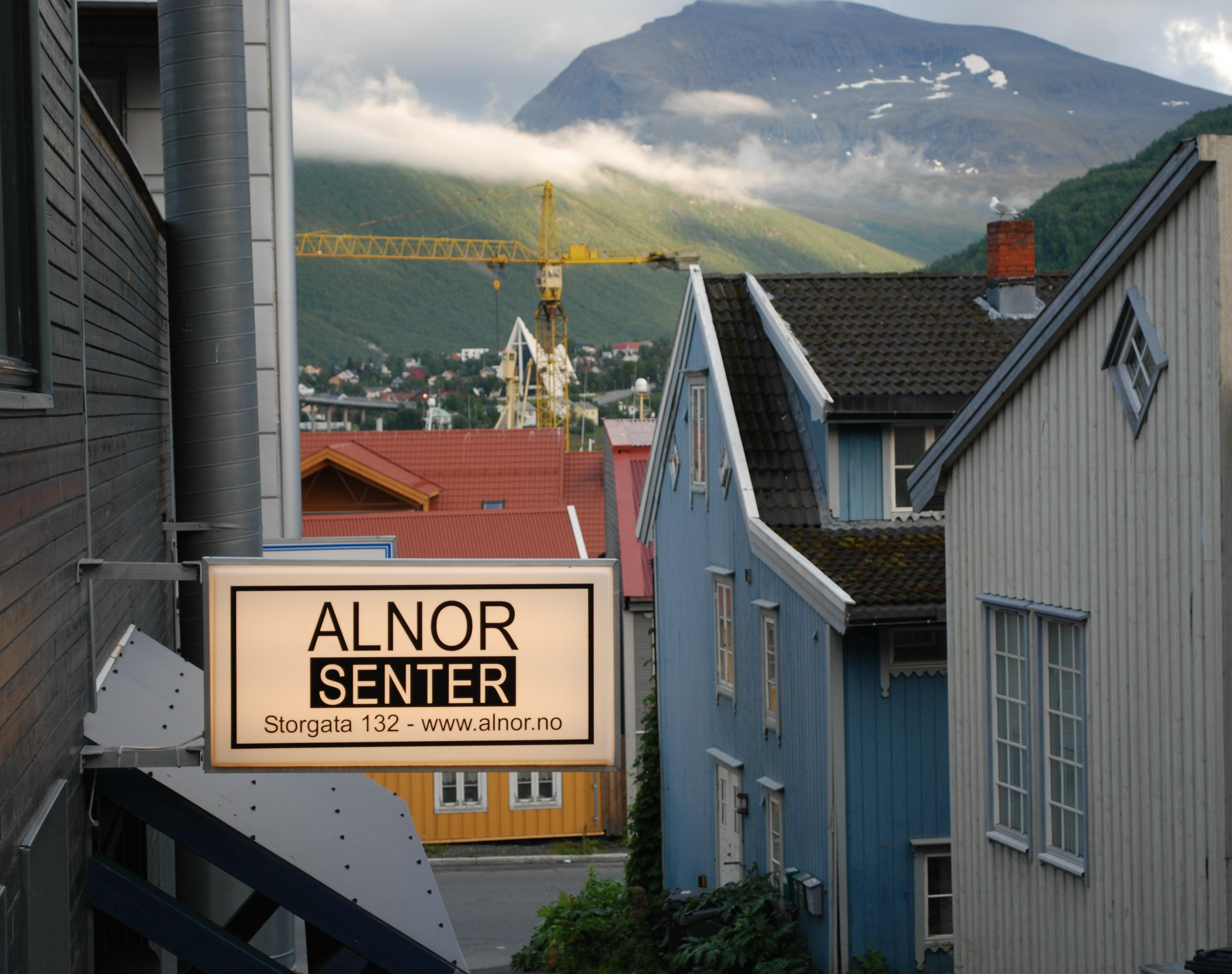
The world's northernmost mosque, in Tromsø

Islam is the largest non-Christian religion in Norway with about 3.4% of the population officially (about 182,000 people in 2019) and has increased by 29.6% since 2014. In 2006, 56% lived in the counties of Oslo and Akershus. Some sources report that the numbers are higher than those on the official records; the Pew Foundation calculates the number of Muslims in Norway for 2010 at about 144,000 and projects the numbers to reach 359,000 by 2030. For 2013, Professor Leirvik of the University of Oslo estimates regarding the number of people of Muslim background though not necessarily practicing in Norway at about 220,000 including people from Pakistan, Somalia, Iraq, Afghanistan, Bosnia, Kosovo, Iran, and Morocco. In the end of the 1990s, Islam passed the Catholic Church and Pentecostalism to become the largest minority religion in Norway (though the Catholics have regained ground since), provided Islam is seen as one united grouping, as there are different denominations in existence, such as Sunni, Shia and Ahmadiyya. In 2009, the registered Muslims were members of 126 different congregations.

=== Judaism ===
There were never many Jews in Norway. Although there are no indications of active persecution, Jews were banned from entering and residing in the dual monarchy of Denmark-Norway for long periods of time. After the split with Denmark in 1814, the new Norwegian Constitution included a notorious paragraph that banned Jews and Jesuits from entering the realm. The paragraph, which was abolished with regard to Jews in 1851 after strong political debate, appears to have been primarily aimed at the Jewish Messianic revival movements in Eastern Europe at the time, since the Sephardi and Western European Jews in many cases seem to have been exempted.

Shechita, Jewish kosher slaughter, has been banned in Norway since 1929.

741 Norwegian Jews were murdered during the Nazi occupation of Norway during World War II, and in 1946 there were only 559 Jews registered living in Norway.

=== Buddhism ===
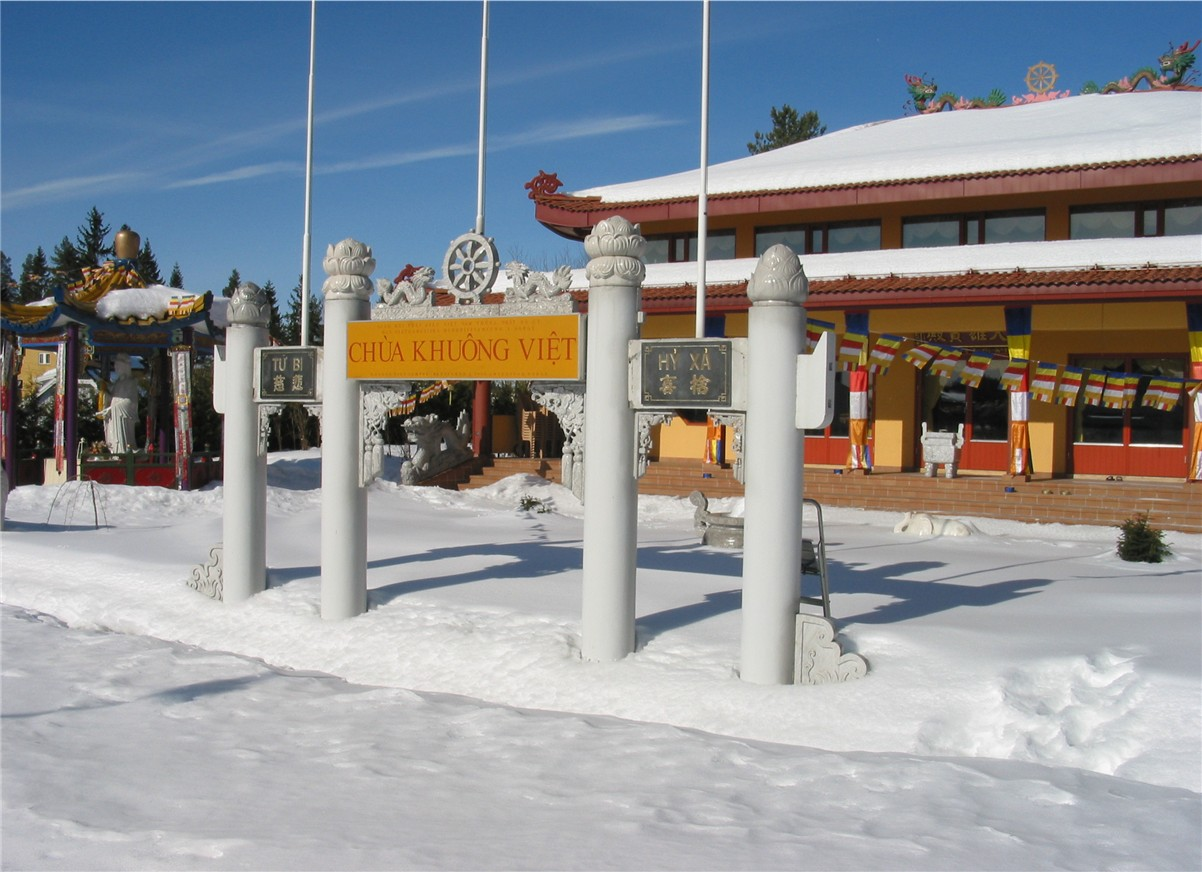
The Vietnamese "Khuông Việt" pagoda at Løvenstad near Oslo, the only of its kind in Norway

Buddhism has existed in Norway since the beginning of the 1970s, after immigration from countries with Buddhist populations, mainly Vietnam. Buddhistforbundet (The Buddhist Federation) in Norway was established as a religious society in 1979 by two Buddhist groups (The Zen School and Karma Tashi Ling buddhistsenter) who wanted to create a common organization to preserve issues of common interest. As of 2013, there are over 30 to 50 thousand (between 0.7% and up to 1% of the total population) registered Buddhists in Norway. Around 5% of them are ethnic Norwegians.

=== Hinduism ===
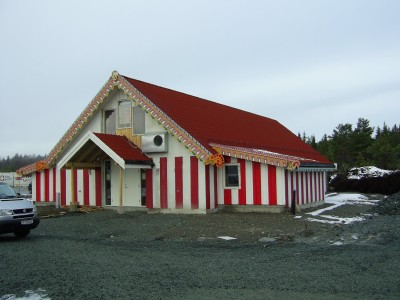
Sri Tiller Ganesha Temple in Trondheim

Hinduism constitute 0.2% of the population of Norway.

=== Baháʼí Faith ===
The Baháʼí Faith in Norway began with contact between traveling Scandinavians with early Persian believers of the Baháʼí Faith in the mid-to-late 19th century. Baháʼís first visited Scandinavia in the 1920s following 'Abdu'l-Bahá's, then head of the religion, request outlining Norway among the countries to which Baháʼís should pioneer and the first Baháʼí to settle in Norway was Johanna Schubartt. Following a period of more Baháʼí pioneers coming to the country, Baháʼí Local Spiritual Assemblies spread across Norway while the national community eventually formed a Baháʼí National Spiritual Assembly in 1962. In 2019 there were around 1100 Baháʼís in the country.

=== Norse religion and modern revival ===
Norse religion was a branch of the wider religious practices of the Germanic people prior to Christianisation and involved the worship of gods such as the Æsir, Thor and Odin. Other gods that are less prominent in the surviving sources include Ullr, the fertility god Njörðr and Frigg, who have been proposed to have previously had a greater role in regions such as Norway, before losing popularity relative to other gods.

Most information about Germanic mythology is contained in the Old Norse literature, the Eddas and later sagas. Other information comes from the Danish historian Saxo Grammaticus and fragments of legends preserved in old inscriptions. Relatively little is known about old religious practices in Norway as most of the knowledge was lost in the gradual Christianisation.

Due to nationalistic movements in the late 18th century, Norwegian scholars found renewed interest for Norse religion, translating many of the myths to Danish (the written language in Norway at the time), popularising legends and trying to use it to create a common Norwegian culture.

A variety of Modern Pagan new religious movements known variously as Heathenry or Åsatru ("Faith of the Aesir") seek to reconstruct the pre-Christian faith practiced by the Germanic peoples such as the Norwegians prior to, and during, the Viking Age.

=== Sámi religion ===
The Sámi follow a shamanistic religion based on nature worship. The Sámi pantheon consists of four general gods: the Mother, the Father, the Son and the Daughter (Radienacca, Radienacce, Radienkiedde and Radienneida). There is also a god of fertility, fire and thunder Horagalles, the sun goddess Beive and the moon goddess Manno as well as the goddess of death Jabemeahkka.

Like many pagan religions, the Sámi traditionally see life as a circular process of life, death and rebirth. The shaman is called a Noaidi and the traditions are passed on between families with an ageing Noaidi training a relative to take their place after he or she dies. Training goes on as long as the Noaidi lives but the pupil had to prove their skills before a group of Noaidi before being eligible to become a fully-fledged shaman at the death of their mentor.

The Norwegian church undertook a campaign to Christianise the Sámi in the 16th and 17th century with most of the sources being missionaries. While the vast majority of the Sámi in Norway have been Christianised, some of them still follow their traditional faith and some Noaidi are still practising their ancient religion. Sami people are often more religious than Norwegians.

== State policy ==
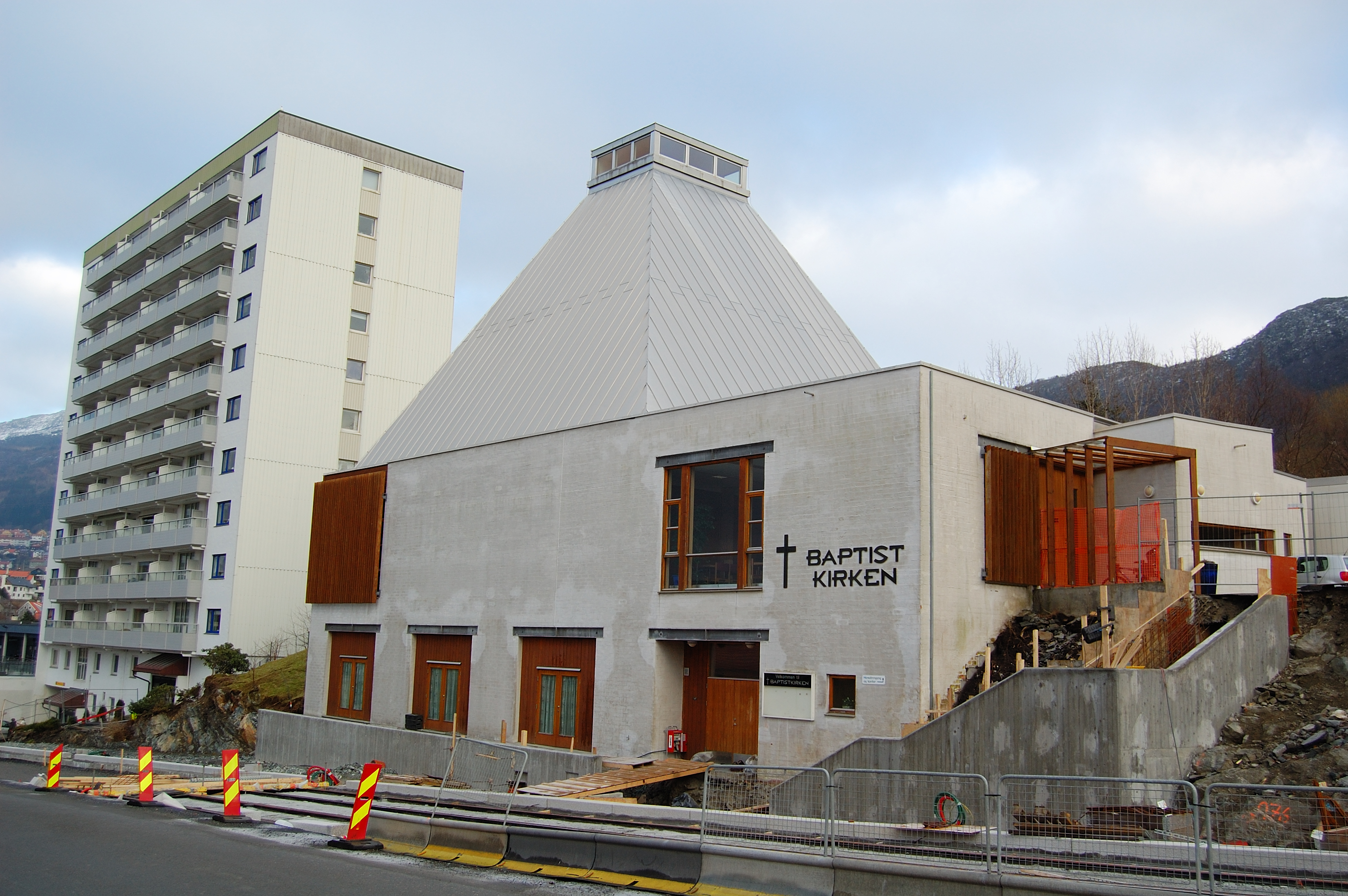
A Norwegian Baptist church in Bergen where many of the worshipers are Christian immigrants

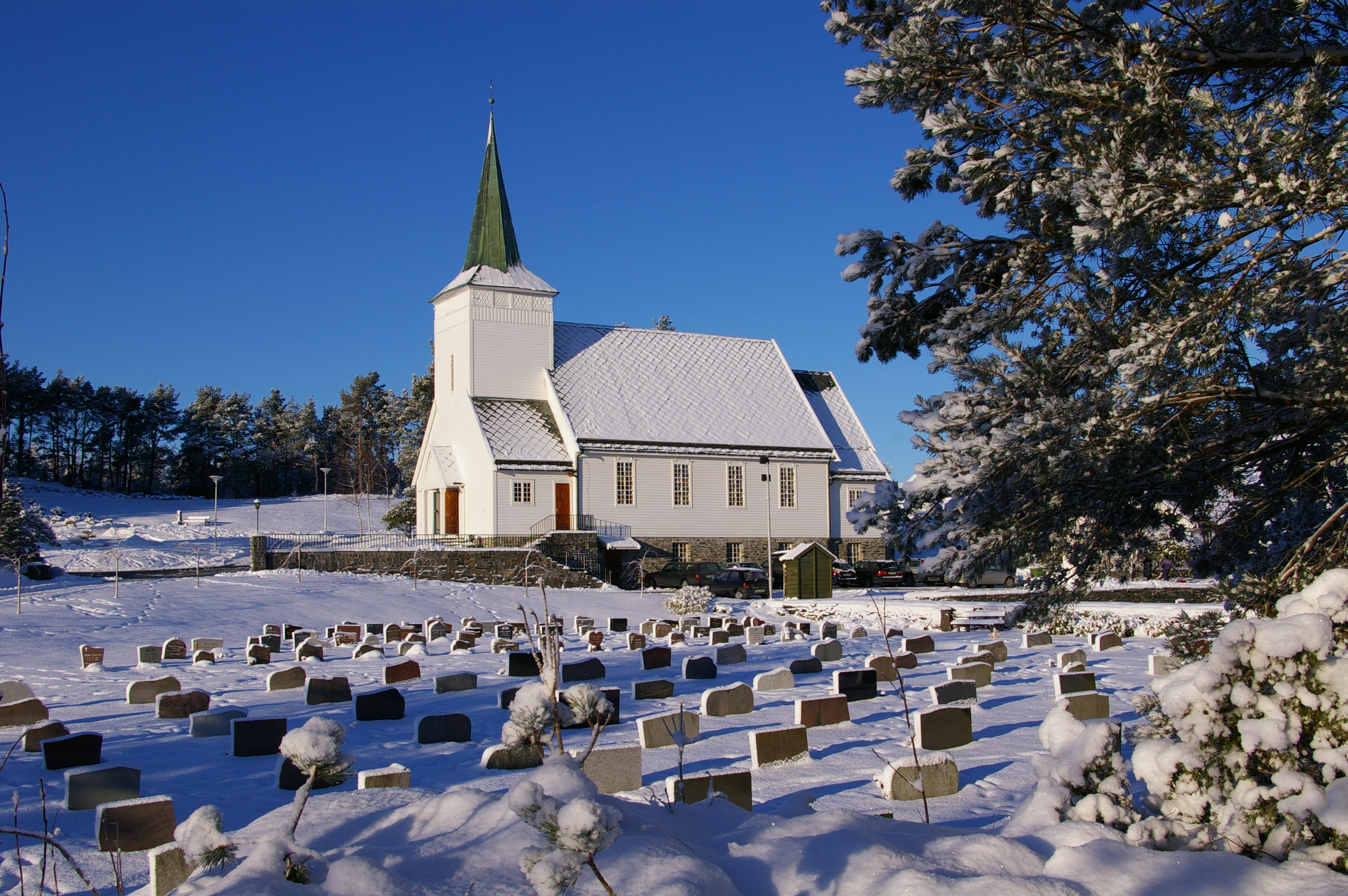
Most Norwegian villages have their own churches, like this one in Askøy Municipality.

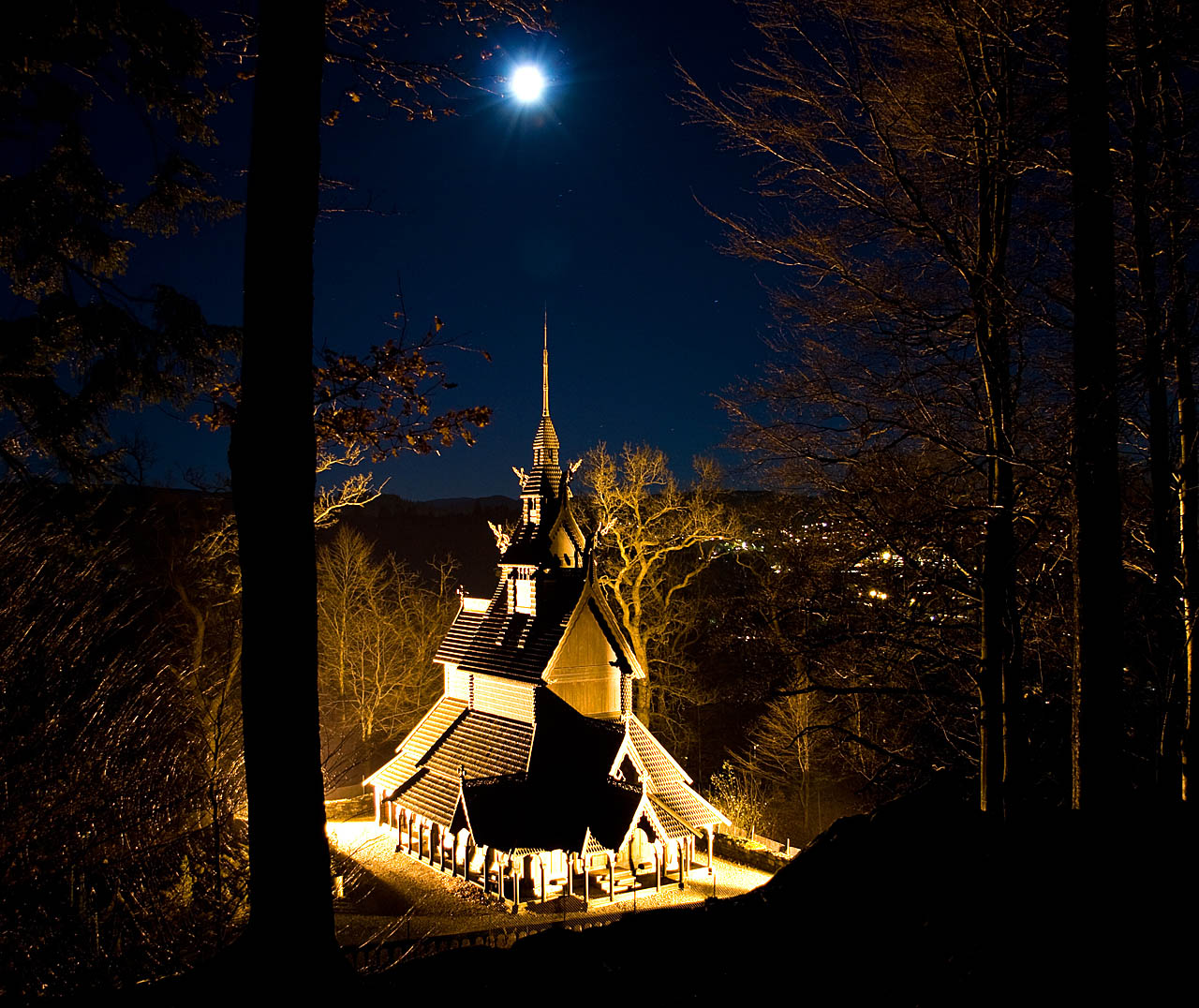
A stave church in Norway

An act approved in 2016 created the Church of Norway as an independent legal entity, effective from 1 January 2017. The Church of Norway was previously the country's public religion, and its central administrative functions were carried out by the Royal Ministry of Government Administration, Reform and Church Affairs until 2017. The Evangelical Lutheran Church is still mentioned in the constitution.

The state also supports religious aid organisations such as Norwegian Church Aid financially. Clergy train in the theological faculties of the University of Oslo and the University of Tromsø, as well as VID Specialized University, formerly Misjonshøgskolen (School of Mission and Theology) in Stavanger and Menighetsfakultetet (MF Norwegian School of Theology) in Oslo. Menighetsfakultetet is by far the most important educational institution for the Norwegian clergy. Men and women can both become members of the clergy of the church. The church has two sacraments namely Baptism and Holy Communion.

=== Religious education ===
In 2007, the European Court of Human Rights ruled in favor of Norwegian parents who had sued the Norwegian state. The case was about a subject in compulsory school, kristendomskunnskap med religions- og livssynsorientering (Teachings of Christianity with orientation about religion and philosophy), KRL. The applicants complained that the refusal to grant full exemption from KRL prevented them from ensuring that their children received an education in conformity with their atheist views and philosophical convictions. A few years earlier, in 2004, the UN Committee on Human Rights in Geneva had given its support to the parents. In 2008 the subject was renamed to Religion, livssyn og etikk (Religion, philosophy and ethics). The majority of this course is however still tied to Christianity. Philosophy and ethics are not properly introduced until after compulsory school. The largest Christian school in Norway has 1,400 pupils and 120 employees. Kristne Friskolers Forbund is an interest group of approximately 130 Christian schools and colleges, including 12 Christian private schools.

=== Religious freedom ===
The constitution establishes that all individuals have the right to exercise their religion. The government's policies generally support the free practice of religion in the country, and it provides funding to religious organizations and anti-discrimination programs on a regular basis. According to NGOs and the Norwegian police, religiously motivated hate speech is prevalent, particularly online, and primarily targeting the Muslim and Jewish communities. The constitution of Norway establishes that "the King shall at all times profess the Evangelical-Lutheran religion".

In 2018, Norway imposed religious clothing bans targeting Muslim women.

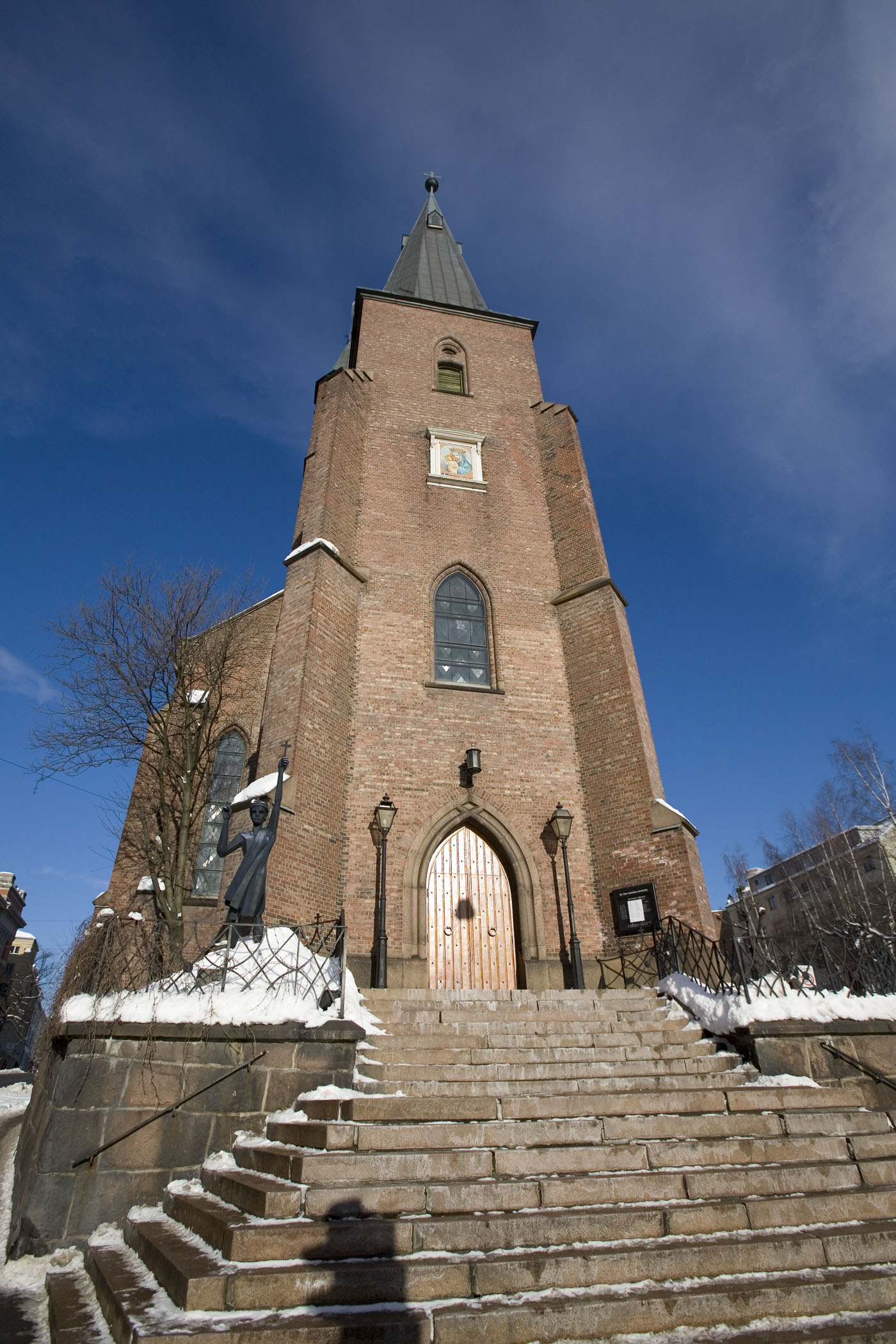
St. Olav's Cathedral in Oslo

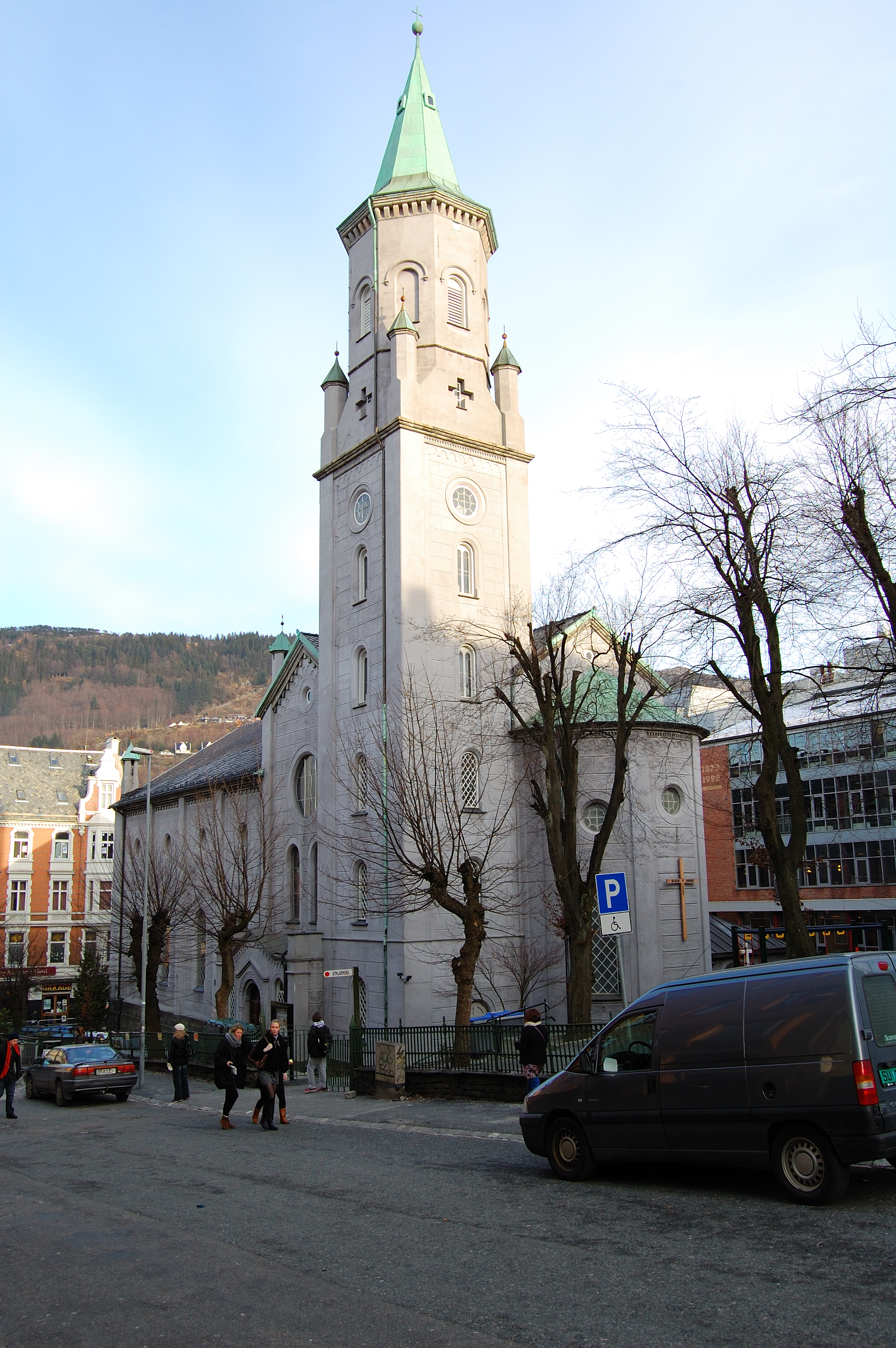
Saint Paul Catholic Church, Bergen

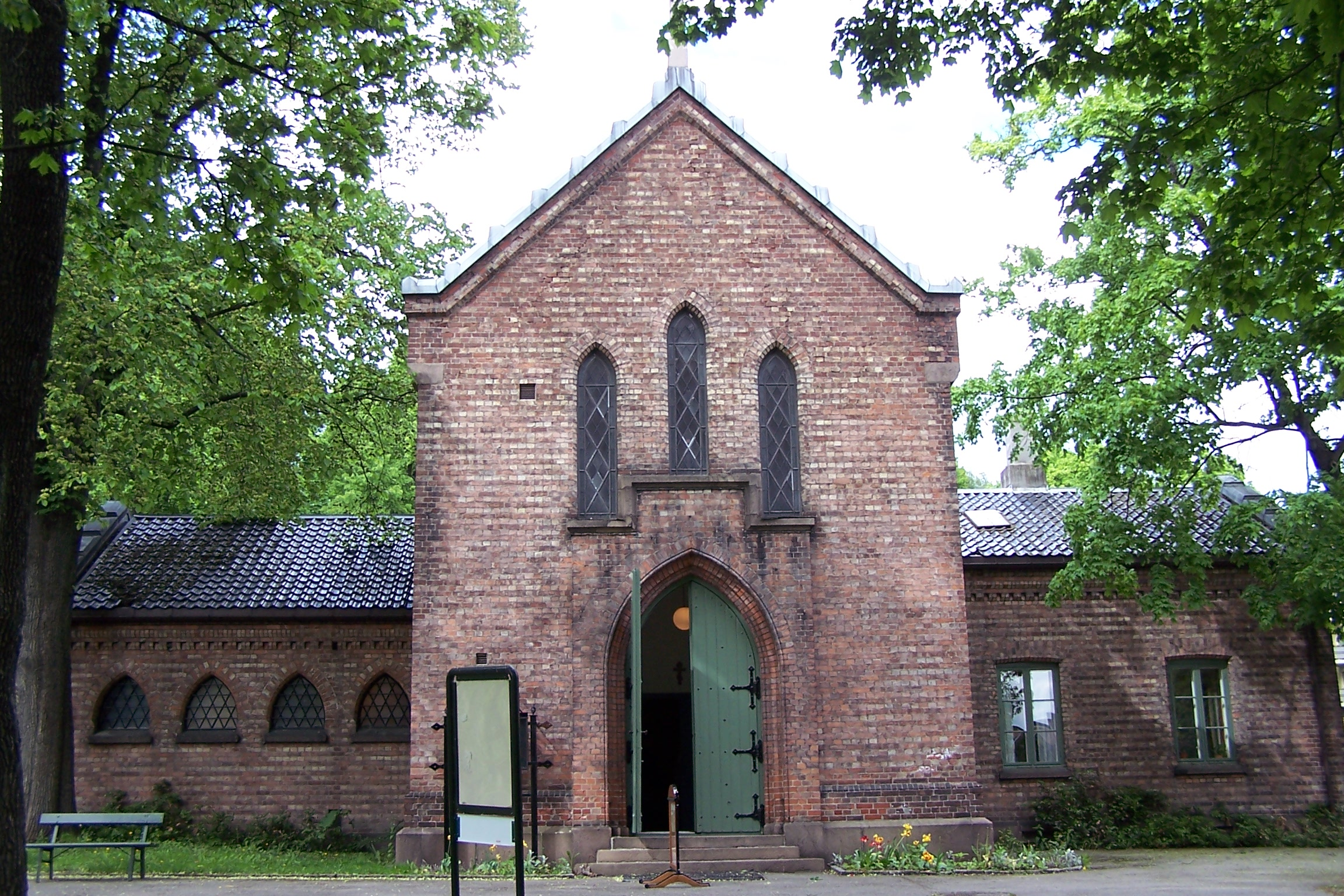
Orthodox church in Oslo

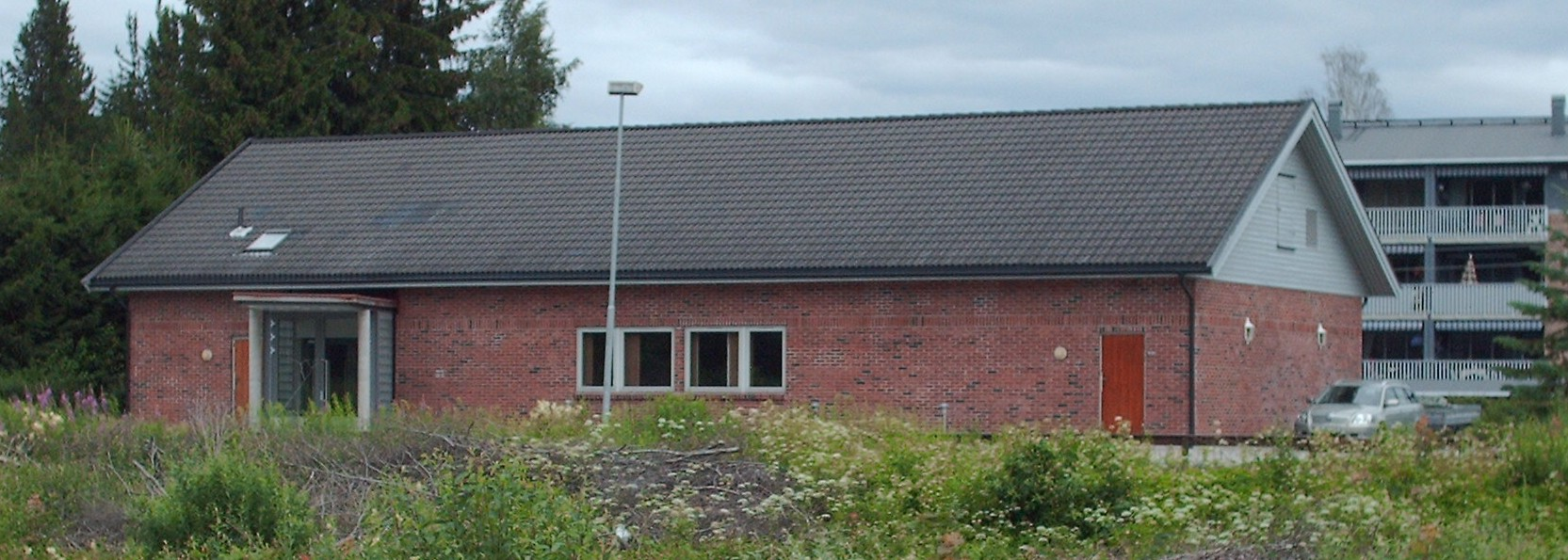
Jehovah's Witness Kingdom Hall in Hønefoss

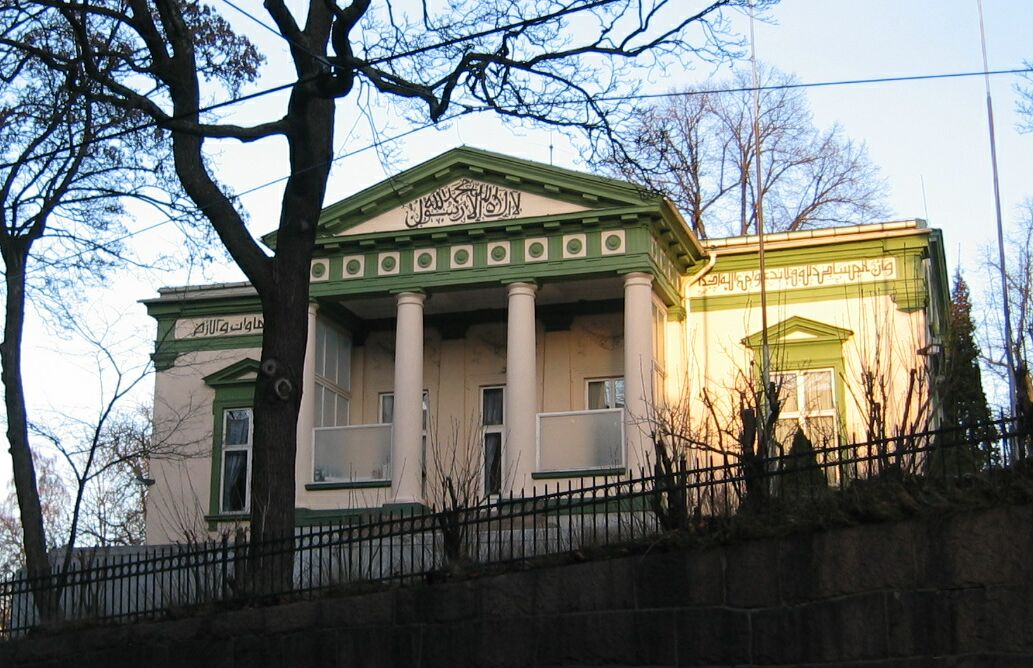
Nor mosque in Oslo

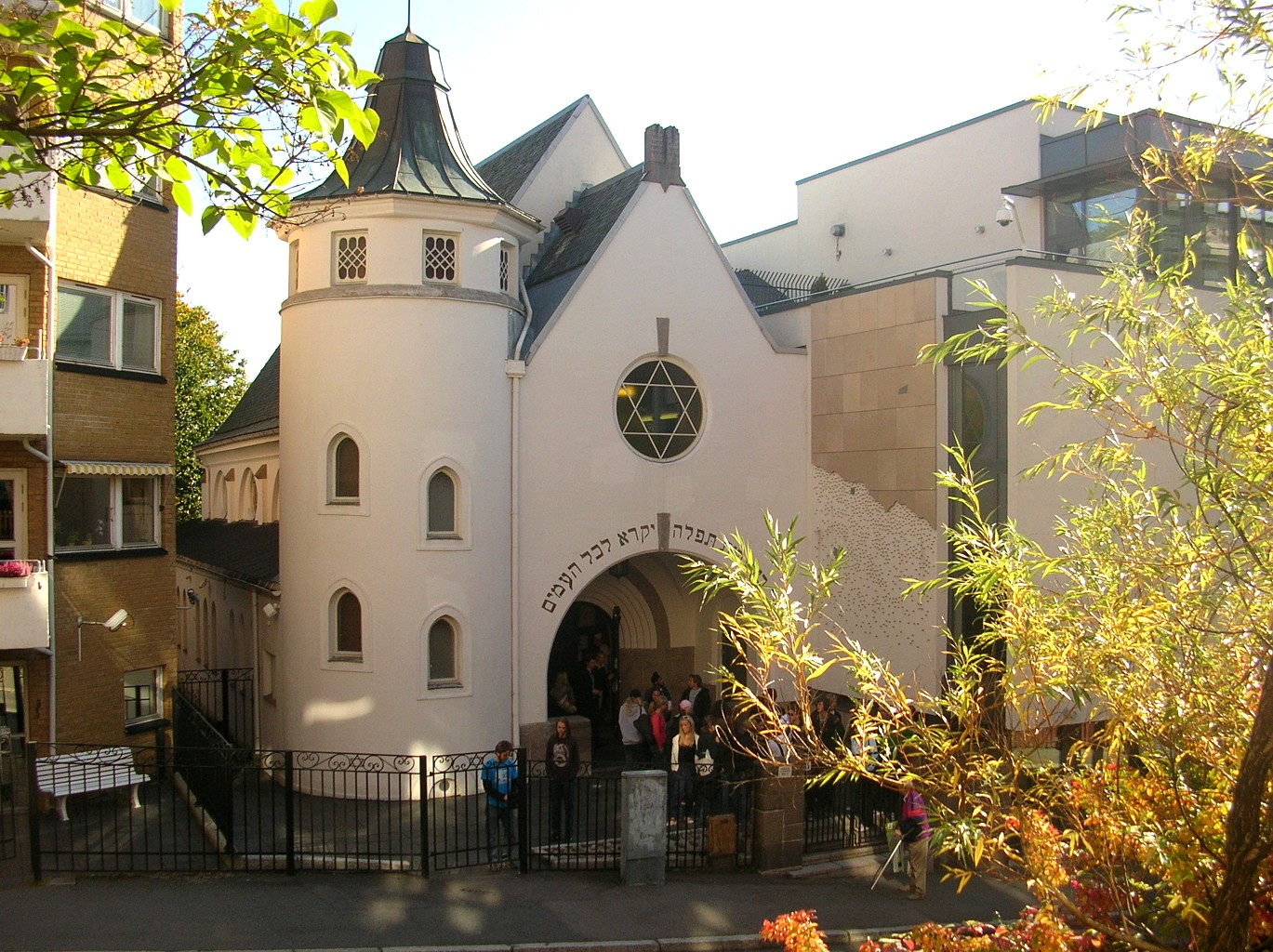
The synagogue in Oslo

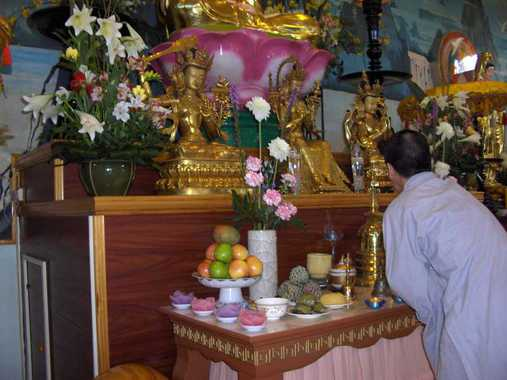
Khuong Viet Buddhist Temple in Oslo

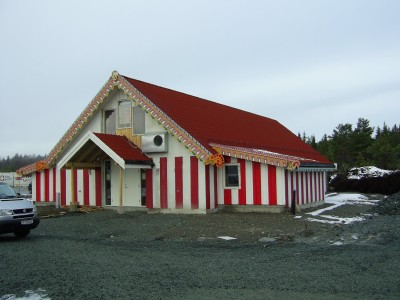
A Hindu temple in Trondheim

== See also ==
- Christianity in Norway
  - Evangelical Lutheran Church of Norway
  - Catholic Church in Norway
  - Christianization of Scandinavia
- Islam in Norway
- Judaism in Norway
- Baháʼí Faith in Norway
- Buddhism in Norway
- Hinduism in Norway
- Sikhism in Norway
- Irreligion in Norway
- Neopaganism in Scandinavia
- Norwegian Humanist Association
- Religion by country
- Religion in Europe
- Bible translations in Norway
