= Immigration to Norway =

View chart definition.
Foreign citizens immigrating to Norway annually, 1967-2019

Immigration to Norway has been a significant factor in the country’s demographic composition. As of 1 January 2024, Norway had 931,081 residents who were immigrants, representing 16.8% of the country's total population of approximately 5.54 million. In addition, 221,459 people (4.0%) were born in Norway to two foreign-born parents, bringing the total population with an immigrant background to 1,152,540, or 20.8% of the population. The largest immigrant groups by country of birth were Poland (109,654), Ukraine (65,566), Lithuania (42,733), Syria (38,708), Sweden (36,612), Somalia (27,665), Germany (26,860), Eritrea (25,137), the Philippines (24,718) and Iraq (Incl. Kurdistan Region) (23,603).

Immigration to Norway has increased over the last decades, beginning in the early 1990s. In 1992, the immigrant population in Norway was 183,000 individuals, representing 4.3% of the total population, and net migration that year was 9,105 people. In 2012, net migration peaked, as 48,714 people moved to the country. Since 2013, net migration has decreased. In 2016, net migration was 27,778.

== History ==
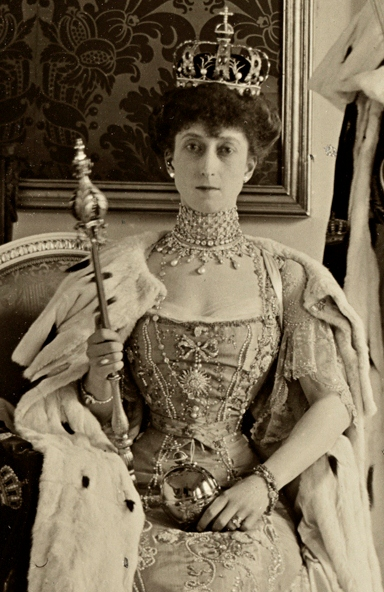
Maud of Wales was the consort of King Haakon VII of Norway (photo's date: 1906).

Historical immigration to Norway started in the Viking Age. The practice of royal intermarriage was common in European aristocracies and elsewhere. The family tree of Norwegian monarchs shows that Norwegian kings used to seek their wives from other royal houses in order to foster ties with foreign countries. Other historical fields linked to migrations were trade and academia, bringing workforce and innovation respectively. The Hanseatic League introduced large scale trade in Bergen and Northern Norway. Mining in Kongsberg, Røros, and other places was made possible by immigrants from nearby countries. During the 19th century the evolution of dairies and the industrial exploitation of waterfalls depended on immigrants. Before the University was established in Christiania in 1811, almost all civil servants from up to circa 1500, were migrants.

From the middle of the 20th century, the history of migration to Norway is characterized by four main phases. The first wave of immigrants came during the 1960s, as a result of demand of labor within the secondary labor market. This group was mainly dominated by men from Pakistan and Turkey, who came to work in the oil sector. The shock of the 1973 Oil Crisis resulted in an immigration stop to Norway, which ended this first wave. The next wave came in the late 1970s, and consisted mostly of family members from former immigrants. The third wave of the mid 1980s was an increasing flow of asylum seekers mainly from Iran (Incl. Kurdistan province), Chile, Vietnam, Sri Lanka and the former Yugoslavia. From the beginning of the 21st century until today, Norwegian immigration has been characterized by a more liberal approach to labor immigration, as well as stricter policies towards asylum seekers.

== Contemporary immigration ==
According to the Norwegian Immigration Act, all foreigners have to apply for permanent residency in order to live and work in Norway, except for citizens of Nordic countries. There are four main reasons for immigration to Norway that are lawfully accepted – employment, education, protection and family reunification. In 2016, most Norwegian immigrants came for family reunification (16,465 people), followed by protection (15,190), work (14,372) and education (4,147). Of the total number of 788,531 people who immigrated between 1990 and 2016, most immigrated for family reunification (283,478), followed by work (262,669), protection (156,590) and education (80,956). Norway is part of the European Economic Area (EEA) and the Schengen area. In 2017, 41.2% of the total immigrant population in Norway were from countries in the EU or EEA. 32.4% were from Asia including Turkey, and 13.7% were from Africa. The remaining 12.7% were from European countries not in the EU or EEA, North America, South America and Oceania.

In 1999, the Norwegian Directorate of Immigration (Norwegian: Utlendingsdirektoratet, UDI) started to use blood testing on Somalis who applied for family reunification with parents. The tests showed that 1 out of 4 lied about the family ties. The tests were later changed to DNA tests to verify family ties. The leader of a Somali community organization in Norway and the Norwegian Medical Association protested the tests and wished they would be discontinued. In 2010, UDI started DNA-tests on Somali childless couples who applied for family reunification where one spouse already resided in Norway. The results showed that 40% of such pairs were siblings. As the tests became widely known, the ratio dropped to 25% and the tests were widened to migrants from other regions. By September 2019, 15 foreign residents who had travelled from Norway to Syria or Iraq to join the Islamic State had their residence permits revoked.

=== Refugees in Norway ===
One cause of immigration in the 20th and 21st century is the need for protection in a new country, due to wars, riots, or political persecution in the migrants' home countries. In the 1950s, refugees came from Hungary to Norway, and in the 1970s from Chile and Vietnam. In the mid-1980s, there was an increase in the number of asylum seekers from countries such as Iran (Incl. Kurdistan province) and Sri Lanka. In the 1990s, war refugees from the Balkans were the predominant immigrant group accepted into Norway; a large number of whom have since returned home to the Balkans. Since the end of the 1990s, new groups of asylum seekers from countries such as Iraq, Somalia, and Afghanistan have arrived in Norway. The Dublin Regulation in 2001 states that non-European refugees applying for asylum in a Dublin country, will only get their application processed once, in the country where they first apply for asylum. In 2005, 94% of refugees arriving to Norway lacked valid identification papers.

During the European migrant crisis in 2015, a total of 31,145 asylum seekers crossed the Norwegian border in 2015. The number had not been as high since the Balkan wars in 1990s. Most of the asylum seekers came from Afghanistan and Syria. In 2016, the number was reduced by almost 90% to 3460. This was partly due to the stricter border control in Europe. The EU-Turkey agreement, implemented 20 March 2016, was made in order strengthen organized channels of immigration to Europe, and prevent irregular migration from Turkey to the EU. Norway has also accepted refugees from other EU countries, In 2020 it granted asylum to anti-racism activist Rafał Gaweł from Poland, who was facing political persecution in his home country. As part of the UN, Norway receives UN quota refugees. In 2015, the Norwegian government announced that they would receive 8,000 Syrian quota refugees between 2015 and 2017.

=== Immigration of Married Children ===
In April 2016, Reuters reported that in the past year, Norway admitted 10 married children (children under 16 years of age). Four had children of their own. The Norwegian Directorate of Immigration (UDI) stated that "some" of the married children in Norway live "with their partners." The head of the PLAN charity stated: "If the girl is aged under 16, the minimum age for sexual intercourse in Norway, the child bride refugee should be separated from her husband even if they have children together."

== Demographics ==
=== Population ===
As of 2014, an official study showed that 4,081,000 people or 79.9% of the total population were Norwegians having no migrant background (both of their parents were born in Norway) and more than 759,000 individuals (14.9%) were immigrants—or descendants of recent immigrants—from neighbouring countries and the rest of the world. A further 235,000 (4.6%) were born in Norway to one foreign-born parent, and 34,000 (0.7%) were born abroad to one parent born in Norway.

In 2012, of the total 710,465 with immigrant background, 407,262 had Norwegian citizenship (60.2 percent). Of these 13.2%, 335,000 (51%) had a Western background mostly from Poland, Germany, and Sweden. 325,000 (49%) had a non-Western background mostly from Turkey, Morocco, Iraq, Somalia, Pakistan and Iran (Incl. Kurdistan province). Immigrants were represented in all Norwegian municipalities. The cities or municipalities with the highest share of immigrants in 2012 were Oslo (30.4 percent), Drammen (25 percent), Lørenskog (23 per cent) and Skien (19.6 percent). According to Reuters, Oslo is the "fastest growing city in Europe because of increased immigration". In recent years, immigration has accounted for most of Norway's population growth.

In 2010, the immigrant community grew by 57,000, which accounted for 90% of Norway's population growth; some 2% of newborn children were of immigrant background (two foreign parents). These statistics indicate that Norway's population is now 87.8% ethnic Norwegian, a figure that has steadily decreased since the late 20th century. Some 12.2% of the population is of solely immigrant background, while 5.7% of the population is of mixed Norwegian-foreign ancestry. People of other European ethnicity are 5.8% of the total, while Asians (including Pakistanis, and Iraqis) are 4.3%, Africans 1.5%, and others 0.6%.

	Immigrants and Norwegian-born to immigrant parents	
	2023	2023
Europe	536 431	49.17%
Africa	149 501	13.70%
Asia	357 625	32.78%
North America	13 706	1.26%
Latin America and the Caribbean	31 061	2.85%
Oceania	2 710	0.25%

Immigrants and Norwegian-born to immigrant parents, by country background. 1 January
	2023			
	Immigrants	Norwegian-born to immigrant parents	Immigrants in per cent of total population	Norwegian-born to immigrant parents in per cent of total population
Total	877 227	213 810	16.0	3.9
Nordic countries except Norway, EU/EFTA, UK, USA, Canada, Australia, New Zealand	378 076	51 274	6.9	0.9
Europe except EU/EFTA and UK, Africa, Asia, America except USA and Canada, Oceania except Australia and New Zealand, polar regions	499 150	162 535	9.1	3.0
Nordic countries except Norway	69 251	7 320	1.3	0.1
EU/EFTA until 2004 except the Nordic countries	85 626	8 852	1.6	0.2
New EU countries after 2004	207 883	34 089	3.8	0.6
Europe except for EU/EFTA/UK	101 058	22 589	1.8	0.4
Australia and New Zealand	2 532	91	0.0	0.0
Asia	265 120	92 273	4.8	1.7
Africa	105 817	43 685	1.9	0.8
America except USA or Canada	27 073	3 985	0.5	0.1
USA and Canada	12 784	922	0.2	0.0
Oceania except Australia and New Zealand	82	3	0.0	0.0

=== Education ===
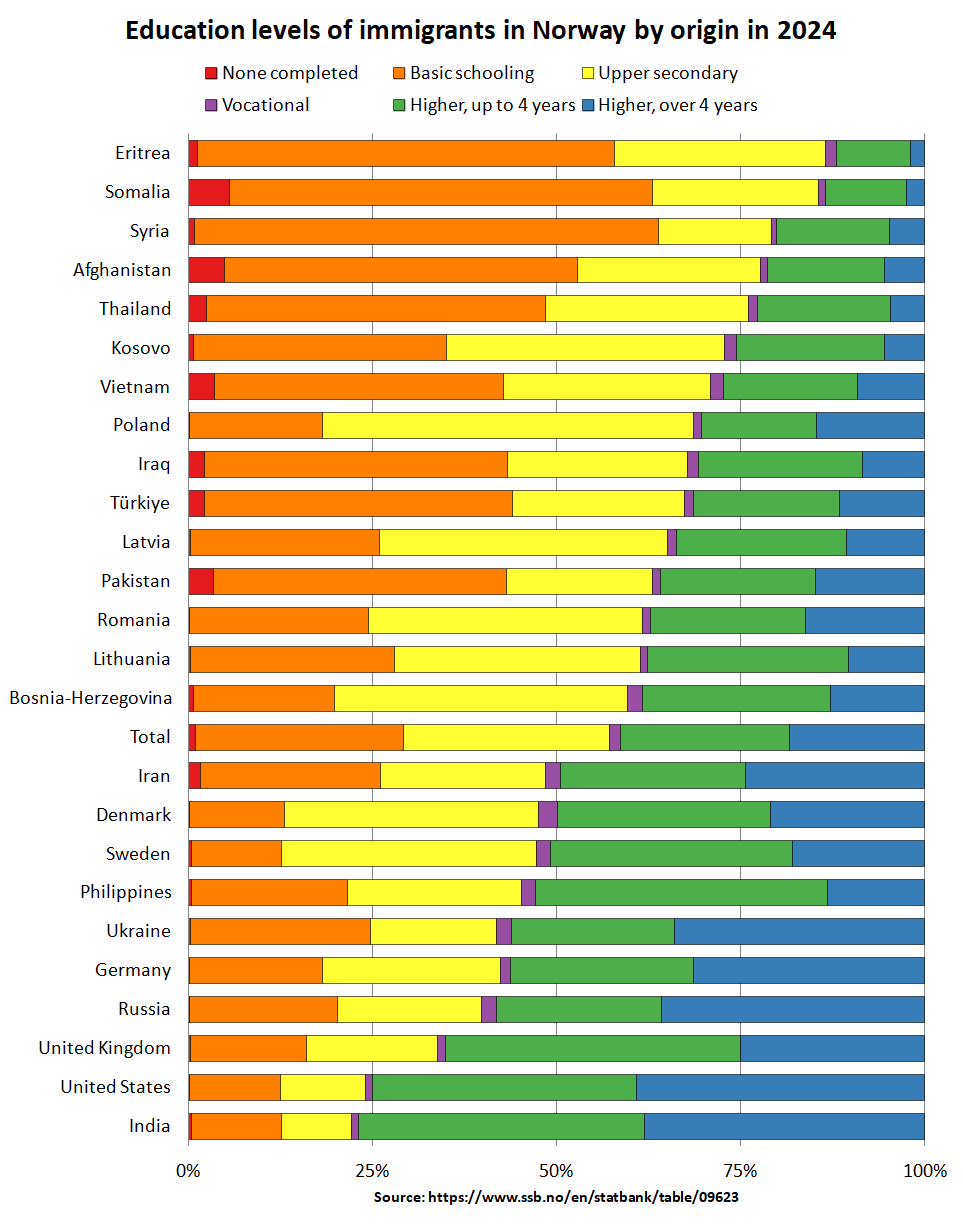
Educational attainment of migrants in Norway in 2024

On average immigrants in Norway are well educated, with 18.5% having completed over four years of higher education as of 2024, compared to 12.5% for the whole population. However, education levels vary between different groups of migrants.

=== Social welfare ===
In 2017, 56% of all state social welfare was paid to immigrants. 86% of which was paid to immigrants from Asia or Africa. The third largest group was immigrants from non-EU Eastern European countries at 6%. In 2024 immigrants received 72% of social assistance spending, with refugees particularly overrepresented. The share of refugee individuals who received social welfare stood at 31%, compared to single-digit rates for other migrant groups and 1.9% for the rest of the population.

=== Religion ===
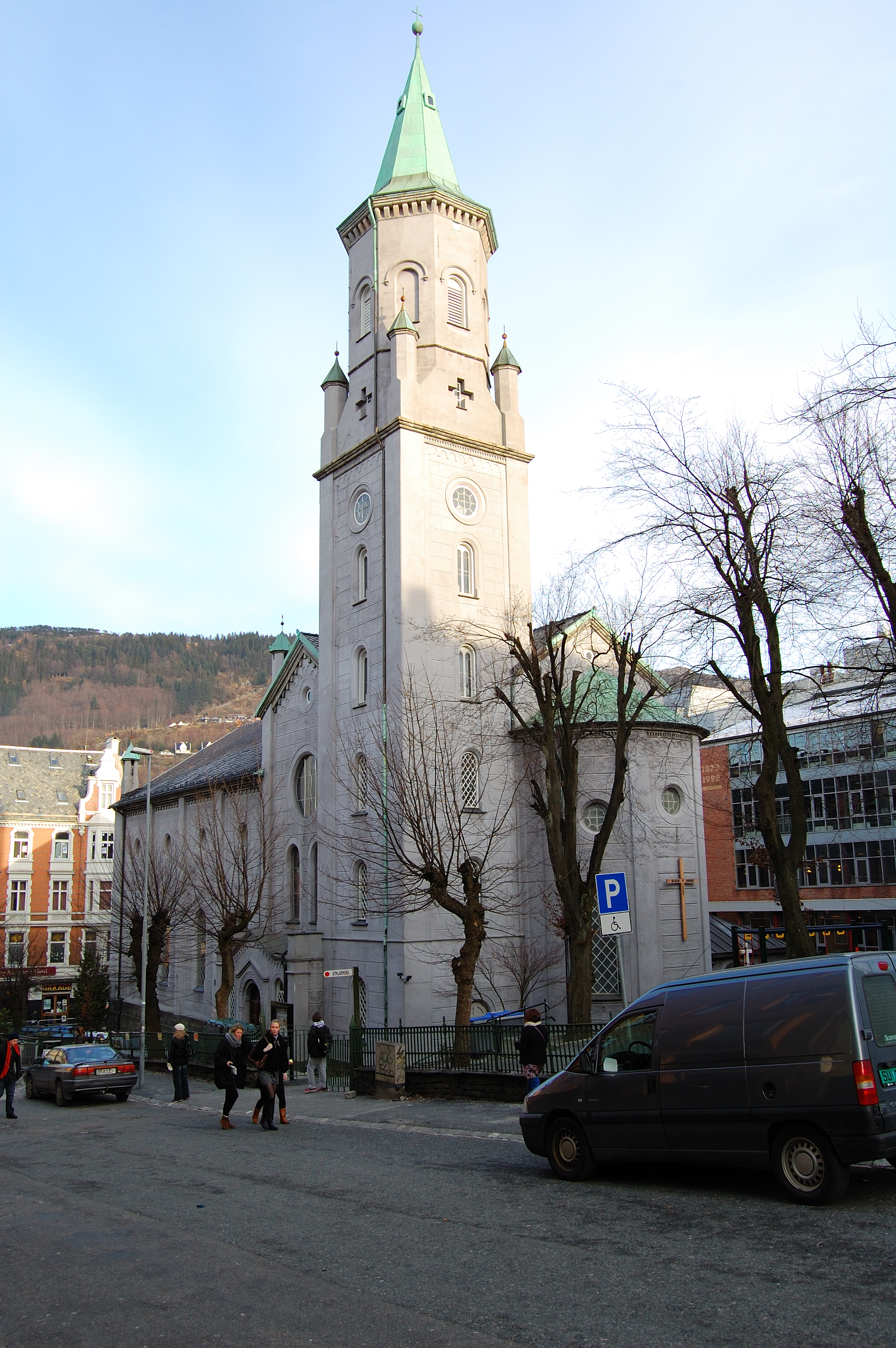
Saint Paul Catholic Church, Bergen. Catholicism in Norway has grown from recent immigration, notably by Poles.

Immigration has altered the religious demography of Norway. Among the immigrants, 250,030 have background from predominantly Christian countries, 119,662 from predominantly Muslim countries, 28,942 from mostly Buddhist countries, and 7,224 from countries that are predominantly Hindu. The proportion of Muslim immigrants has fallen drastically in recent years, from about 80% in 2000 to less than 20% in 2007.

As of 2008 there were living in Norway somewhere between 120,000 and 163,000 persons who had either immigrated from or who had parents who had immigrated from countries where Islam is the predominant religion, accounting for up to 3.4% of the country's total population. This number should be interpreted with caution according to a report by Statistics Norway, as there are significant religious minorities in several of these countries, and varying degrees of commitment to the religion. In the same year, 84,000 persons were members of an Islamic congregation. The largest single denomination besides the state church is the Roman Catholic Church, which had a membership of more than 54,000 in 2008. It gained about 10,000 new members, mostly Poles, in the period 2004–2008. Other religions which have increased mainly as a result of recent post-war immigration (with percentages of adherents in parentheses), include Hinduism (0.5%), Buddhism (0.4%), Eastern Orthodoxy and Oriental Orthodoxy (0.2%) and the Bahá'í Faith (<0.1%).

=== Employment ===
Statistics Norway has been criticized in 2018 for misrepresenting employment levels for African and Asian immigrants due to employment was counted from 1 weekly hour of work. Counting full-time employment as 30 hours of work per week, the figures were significantly lower. While official figures show that 35.2% of Pakistani female immigrants are employed, only 20% are in full-time employment.

Employment rates of the 20 most common migrant groups in Norway, aged 20–66
Country of origin	2015	2016	2017	2018	2019
Poland	72.2	74.2	75.1	76.7	75.9
Lithuania	71.2	63.0	74.6	77.0	76.8
Somalia	33.6	36.0	39.0	41.3	43.3
Sweden	82.2	81.8	82.3	82.7	82.7
Pakistan	50.7	51.7	52.7	54.1	55.5
Syria	21.1	16.2	20.4	30.0	35.9
Iraq	45.8	47.8	48.2	50.3	51.4
Eritrea	39.0	41.8	46.4	51.7	58.6
Germany	76.8	77.6	78.1	78.9	78.1
Philippines	64.4	66.9	70.1	71.5	72.4
Vietnam	63.4	62.9	63.3	64.2	64.7
Iran (Incl. Kurdistan province)	56.7	56.7	57.1	58.8	59.9
Thailand	66.2	65.6	67.4	68.6	70.1
Russia	63.0	63.7	64.4	66.7	67.1
Afghanistan	55.1	55.9	57.4	59.0	59.6
Denmark	76.9	76.5	76.7	77.3	77.1
Turkey	52.8	53.2	54.8	55.0	54.4
India	61.3	62.4	63.6	64.3	65.7
Bosnia-Herzegovina	68.7	68.7	70.1	71.0	71.5
Romania	68.8	68.5	69.5	69.9	70.1
Whole population	75.0	74.8	75.3	76.1	76.3
All migrants	63.9	64.0	65.0	66.5	67.1

==== Unemployment ====
Immigrant employment rates are generally higher in Norway than overall employment rates in most countries, the overall unemployment rate among immigrants being 6.5% in May 2011, totalling about 20,000 persons. The unemployment rate in the population as a whole was 2.7% at this time. There are differences between immigrant groups. People with Ukrainian backgrounds have the highest unemployment rates, with 79.4%. Unemployment rates among immigrants from Asia and Eastern Europe were 8.2% and 7.4%, respectively. Persons born in Norway to immigrant parents, still a young and relatively small demographic, had an unemployment rate of 5.0%, totalling 766 persons. This was 1.6 percentage points above persons with Norwegian-born parents in the same age group, and 2.1 percentage points below immigrants in the same age group.

==== Workforce participation ====
Overall workforce participation in the immigrant population was 61.6% in 2010, compared to 71.9% for the population as a whole. Ukrainian immigrants had the lowest workforce participation, with 20.9%. Persons born to immigrant parents had a workforce participation of 53.0%, similar to that of the corresponding age demographic with Norwegian-born parents.

=== Health ===
Immigrants from low income countries in Africa and Asia constitute a large proportion of those diagnosed with chronic infectious diseases Tuberculosis, HIV and Hepatitis B. Those who fall ill are often infected in their country of origin and are only diagnosed as they arrive in Norway, or they are infected during later visits to the home country of their family. In addition, these immigrants are less likely than Norwegian travellers to take travel vaccines against malaria, as they are unaware that after a couple of years in Norway they lose the immunity they had in their home country. Immigrants also socialize more with other immigrants and are therefore at greater risk of being infected while in Norway.

In 2016, there were 298 reported cases of tuberculosis; of these, about 90% were people born outside Norway. In the 2013–2017 period people born outside Norway represented 60% of the about 225 annual cases of HIV infections and 96% of the 675 annual cases of chronic Heptatitis B.

== Effects of immigration ==
=== Demographic ===
Norwegian and foreign born population pyramid in 2023

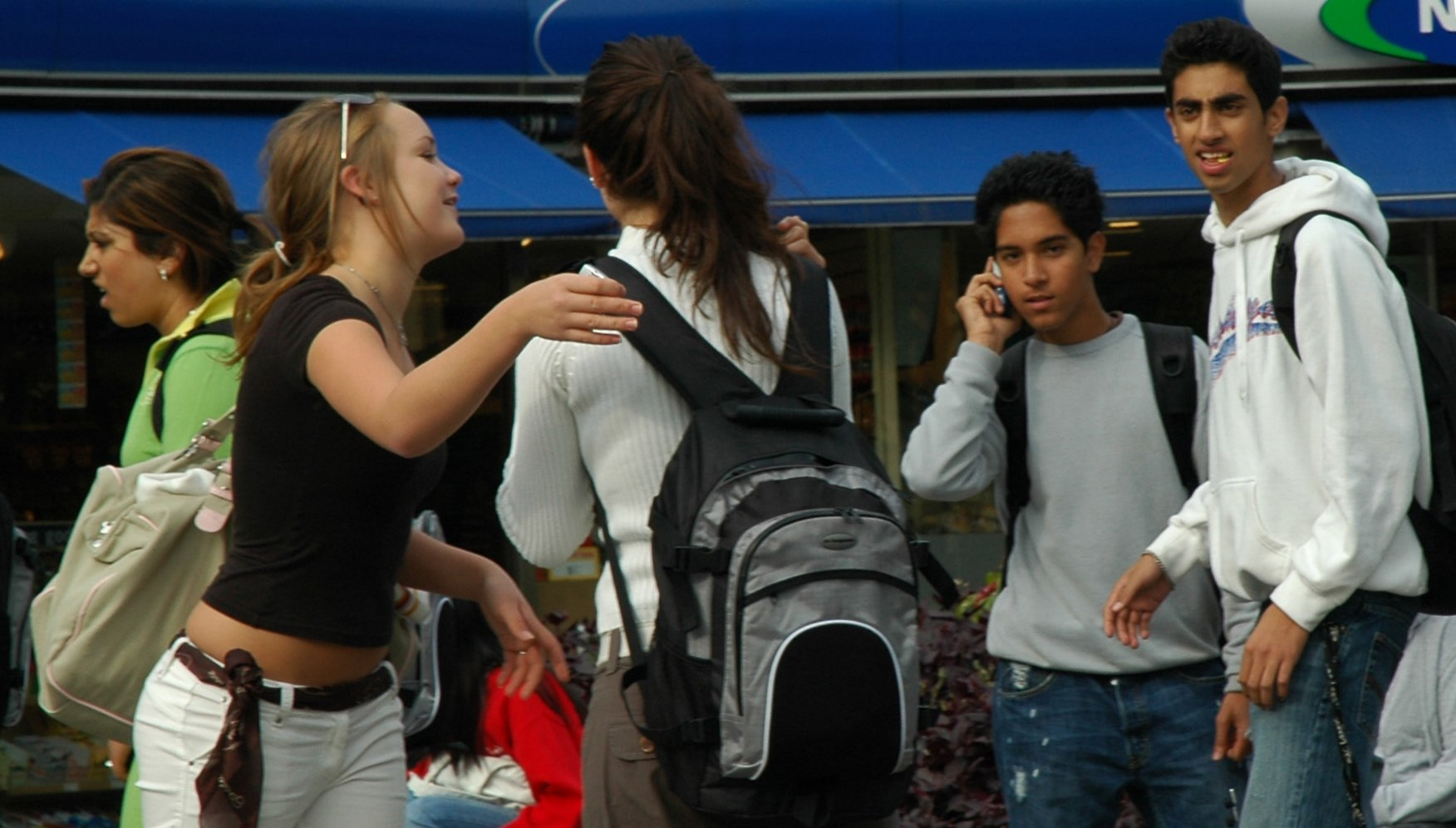
Youths in Oslo

From 1977 to 2012, the number of non-Norwegian citizens living in Norway of European descent increased from around 46,000 to around 280,000. In the same period the number of citizens of nations on other continents increased from about 25,000 to about 127,000, of which 112,230 were from the Middle East, Asia, Africa and South America. If people with two immigrant parents are counted, the total immigrant population has risen from 57,041 in 1970 to 710,465 in 2012, and the non-European proportion rose from 20.1% to 46.1%. The proportion of women in the immigrant population shifted from 56.1% in 1970 to 48.0% in 2012. According to a book chapter published by Amsterdam University in 2008 and authored by Prof. Mete Feridun of the University of Greenwich, immigration has a positive impact on economic growth in Norway and it has no statistically significant impact on unemployment in the job market.

=== Crime ===
According to an analysis of 1998–2002 crime statistics, non-Western immigrants were overrepresented for violent crime, economic crime and traffic violations. According to data released by the European Council, 341 out of the year 2000 prison inmate population of 2643 were foreign nationals, a share of 12.9%. In the year 2010 foreign nationals represented 1129 out of a 3636 total, a 31.1% share. These figures were corroborated by officials of the Norwegian Correctional Service which stated the rising trend escalated when 8 countries joined the Schengen Area in 2007. In order to decrease costs for interpreters and other special needs of foreign inmates, foreign nationals serving sentences involving subsequent deportation were in 2012 incarcerated in an institution holding only foreigners as they are not intended to be re-integrated into Norwegian society. This institution opened in December 2012 in Kongsvinger.

In September 2016, Norwegian authorities discovered that more than a million identity papers had been issued without stringent checks which enabled fraudsters to claim social welfare benefits of many persons simultaneously. 2007 was the first time when foreign perpetrators of partner murders were in the majority. While 13% of Norway's population are foreigners, they represent 47% of perpetrators who have murdered their partner. The most prevalent countries of origin were: Iran & Kurdistan, Afghanistan, Iraq, Somalia and Eritrea. In 2018, an investigation into court cases involving domestic violence against children showed that 47% of the cases involved parents who were both born abroad. According to a researcher at Norwegian Police University College the over-representation was due to cultural (honor culture) and legal differences in Norway and foreign countries.

=== Fiscal effects ===
According to Statistics Norway, every non-Western immigrant mean net deficit of 4.1 million NOK for Norwegian authorities, where tax income are reduced by welfare payments. The 15400 non-Western immigrants who arrived in 2012 will then result in expenses of about 63 000 million NOK, half the sum the Norwegian government revenue from the oil fund. Immigrants from Africa and Asia generally contributed less to tax uptake of the Norwegian state, where immigrants from Africa aged 25–62 contributed 50 000 NOK annually, immigrants from Asia contributed 70 000 NOK annually and the general population 140 000 NOK annually. Of the immigrant population 7.5% received social benefits compared to the other population at 2.2% The share of immigrants from Ukraine on social benefits was 78%, Somalia 38% Syria 30%, Afghanistan 22% and Iraq 20%.

According to calculations by Finansavisen, the cost of the average Somali to the state is 9 million NOK, assuming that the descendants are perfectly integrated into Norwegian society. Of non-Western immigrants, Tamils do best with a cost of 1 million NOK. Swedes who already have an education and migrate to Norway give a net addition to the state balance sheet. Neighbouring countries India and Pakistan have a significant difference in state expenses, whereas the average Indian lead to costs of 1.6 million NOK, the average Pakistani costs 5.1 million NOK.

== Legal and administration issues ==
The Directorate of Immigration (UDI) is responsible for the administration of immigration into the country. Before the UDI was established in 1988, several government organisations were involved in administering immigration. Another body, Integrerings- og mangfoldsdirektoratet (IMDi) (Directorate of Integration and Diversity), "contribute[s] to equality in living conditions and diversity through employment, integration and participation".

== Immigrants and Norwegian-born to immigrant parents, by country of origin ==
Country of origin	Population (1970)	Population (1980)	Population (1990)	Population (2000)	Population (2010)	Population (2020)
Poland	1,198	1,672	4,661	6,282	52,125	115,416
Sweden	11,198	11,018	12,732	23,240	31,193	38,854
Somalia	3	31	1,391	8,386	25,496	43,273
Lithuania	3	4	8	278	10,341	47,304
Pakistan	163	6,828	15,488	22,831	31,061	38,674
Iraq	20	38	759	7,664	26,374	34,268
Germany	5,295	5,891	6,718	9,102	22,859	28,258
Vietnam	20	2,072	8,757	15,390	20,100	23,655
Denmark	12,306	14,571	18,543	18,863	19,298	21,010
Philippines	70	789	3,384	5,573	13,447	26,334
Iran (Incl. Kurdistan province)	43	135	5,381	10,354	16,321	23,331
Russia	41	43	59	3,012	14,873	22,191
Turkey	236	2,384	6,155	10,481	15,998	20,075
Bosnia-Herzegovina	0	0	3	12,614	15,918	18,542
Thailand	29	191	1,097	3,298	12,268	22,194
Afghanistan	0	3	266	804	10,475	21,942
Sri Lanka	23	263	4,893	9,826	13,772	15,737
United Kingdom	4,738	8,658	11,830	11,161	12,843	16,154
Kosovo	0	0	0	0	12,719	16,357
Eritrea	0	3	18	733	5,789	29,102
India	246	1,882	4,672	5,996	9,747	19,135
Romania	115	150	309	994	4,533	17,653
China, People's Republic of	369	683	1,968	3,548	7,326	11,856
Latvia	11	14	14	318	2,856	12,318
Morocco	401	1,286	3,064	5,409	8,058	10,738
United States	7,069	10,289	8,999	7,571	7,707	10,213
Iceland	761	1,566	2,144	3,819	4,966	8,001
Netherlands	1,465	2,222	2,926	3,821	6,926	8,974
Chile	85	947	5,901	6,377	7,607	7,983
Ethiopia	8	227	1,532	2,525	5,156	12,036
Finland	1,993	3,590	4,146	6,550	6,665	7,373
France	705	1,683	2,006	2,364	3,930	6,389
Bulgaria	256	166	339	769	2,152	8,212
Estonia	16	24	24	303	2,092	5,233
Spain	591	893	1,143	1,363	2,205	7,342
Serbia	0	0	0	0	2,748	8,874
Ukraine	6	6	3	331	2,604	6,939
Brazil	68	140	397	730	2,814	5,871
Syria	7	48	213	763	2,010	36,026
Myanmar	6	13	31	60	3,015	4,186
Palestine	0	0	0	64	2,939	4,331
Slovakia	0	6	3	158	2,142	4,309
Hungary	1,481	1,562	1,646	1,642	2,288	4,734
Croatia	0	3	10	1,541	3,244	6,109
North Macedonia	0	0	0	707	3,117	4,459
Italy	598	748	925	1,219	1,992	5,162
Sudan	3	27	59	371	1,318	6,164
Lebanon	11	85	614	1,540	2,397	3,865
Congo, Democratic Republic of	12	12	93	236	2,050	4,300
Portugal	147	390	605	701	1,079	3,906
Ghana	11	33	777	1,341	2,034	3,022
Czech Republic	109	141	165	526	1,464	2,556
Nigeria	11	118	332	504	1,247	2,692
Colombia	32	107	250	476	1,216	2,451
Canada	688	951	1,057	1,138	1,602	2,245
Greece	185	257	437	504	743	3,550
Algeria	66	136	478	880	1,497	1,874
Kenya	13	124	340	642	1,275	2,373
Gambia	19	153	615	984	1,409	1,855
Australia	234	393	483	600	1,220	1,917
Indonesia	102	164	241	383	1,148	1,851
Switzerland	470	610	741	932	1,204	1,740
Nepal	0	0	19	126	681	2,605
Burundi	0	0	3	62	1,119	1,561
Peru	30	71	212	458	1,054	1,587
Tunisia	39	106	382	607	1,106	1,596
Austria	593	659	748	792	997	1,480
Liberia	3	8	23	26	1,075	1,240
Uganda	11	176	246	473	903	2,383
Belgium	256	388	564	600	879	1,460
Mexico	31	79	161	317	773	1,609
Bangladesh	3	51	476	457	799	1,696
Belarus	0	0	0	105	710	1,487
South Korea	25	107	321	395	795	1,430
Venezuela	12	30	55	134	580	1,397
Ireland	120	249	410	460	640	1,101
Cuba	8	14	40	204	736	1,205
Kazakhstan	0	0	0	46	715	1,203
South Africa	203	306	375	493	773	1,298
Japan	216	410	538	579	787	1,181
Argentina	141	239	309	371	649	1,256
Albania	23	15	21	156	491	2,996
Hong Kong	33	211	584	741	831	1,110
Faroe Islands	284	432	455	853	754	751
Dominican Republic	3	8	53	247	609	1,131
Tanzania	7	68	182	414	739	947
Rwanda	3	3	6	176	653	900
Malaysia	10	90	160	273	485	973
Israel	70	152	372	453	612	817
Moldova	0	0	3	26	323	1,667
Cameroon	8	15	19	62	472	886
Sierra Leone	14	25	149	227	553	689
Azerbaijan	0	0	0	77	435	718
Libya	0	5	46	56	302	1,055
Cambodia	0	8	147	271	485	632
Jordan	3	22	57	133	388	858
Cape Verde	10	63	193	293	496	527
New Zealand	106	164	204	230	432	544
Angola	0	0	22	96	408	566
Ecuador	11	40	65	161	350	642
Uzbekistan	0	0	0	31	326	796
Montenegro	0	0	0	0	350	701
Kuwait	0	3	13	131	345	671
Saudi Arabia	3	0	16	43	220	1,223
Singapore	13	98	178	215	352	519
Yemen	0	0	11	45	197	816
Zambia	0	6	58	106	301	521
Bhutan	0	0	3	8	229	421
Slovenia	0	0	0	53	203	529
Georgia	0	0	0	17	228	398
Armenia	0	0	0	30	226	405
Bolivia	6	13	86	120	230	391
Côte d'Ivoire	3	8	59	106	258	410
United Arab Emirates	0	0	3	33	166	647
Senegal	0	4	29	72	205	417
Guinea	8	9	34	38	154	423
Trinidad and Tobago	48	117	159	195	259	288
Taiwan	0	15	95	114	218	384
Zimbabwe	3	11	47	111	193	326
Congo, Republic of	0	3	14	22	151	321
El Salvador	3	6	54	126	190	285
Uruguay	12	87	158	173	185	250
Madagascar	97	105	127	139	198	243
Mauritius	14	108	177	179	211	235
Kyrgyzstan	0	0	0	3	149	302
South Sudan	0	0	0	0	0	435
Guatemala	8	22	42	74	146	241
Greenland	7	33	69	120	164	212
Mozambique	3	6	23	55	126	200
Jamaica	4	30	39	65	135	194
Nicaragua	3	9	28	76	137	209
Togo	3	3	54	78	129	175
Cyprus	12	32	70	91	103	184
Mongolia	0	0	0	7	96	188
Costa Rica	3	16	34	54	112	190
Tajikistan	0	0	0	10	102	152
Honduras	7	13	58	63	101	152
Laos	0	3	60	57	92	159

== Opposition ==
The Norwegian far-right opposes immigration from non-European countries. The Progress Party describes their position like this: "Immigration from countries outside the EEA must be strictly enforced to ensure a successful integration. It can not be accepted that fundamental Western values and human rights are set aside by cultures and attitudes that certain groups of immigrants bring with them to Norway." In the 2011 terrorist attacks, a former Progress Party member murdered 77 people, mostly children and young adults attending a Labour Party youth event. The attacker opposed migration for anti-Islamic reasons and accused the Labour Party of "promoting multiculturalism".

From 1987-1995, Norway had a party called Stop the Immigration.

== See also ==
- Opposition to immigration
- Remigration
- List of countries by foreign-born population
- List of sovereign states and dependent territories by fertility rate
