= Orthodoxy in Norway =

Orthodoxy in Norway may refer to:

- Eastern Orthodoxy in Norway
- Oriental Orthodoxy in Norway
