= Buddhism in Norway =

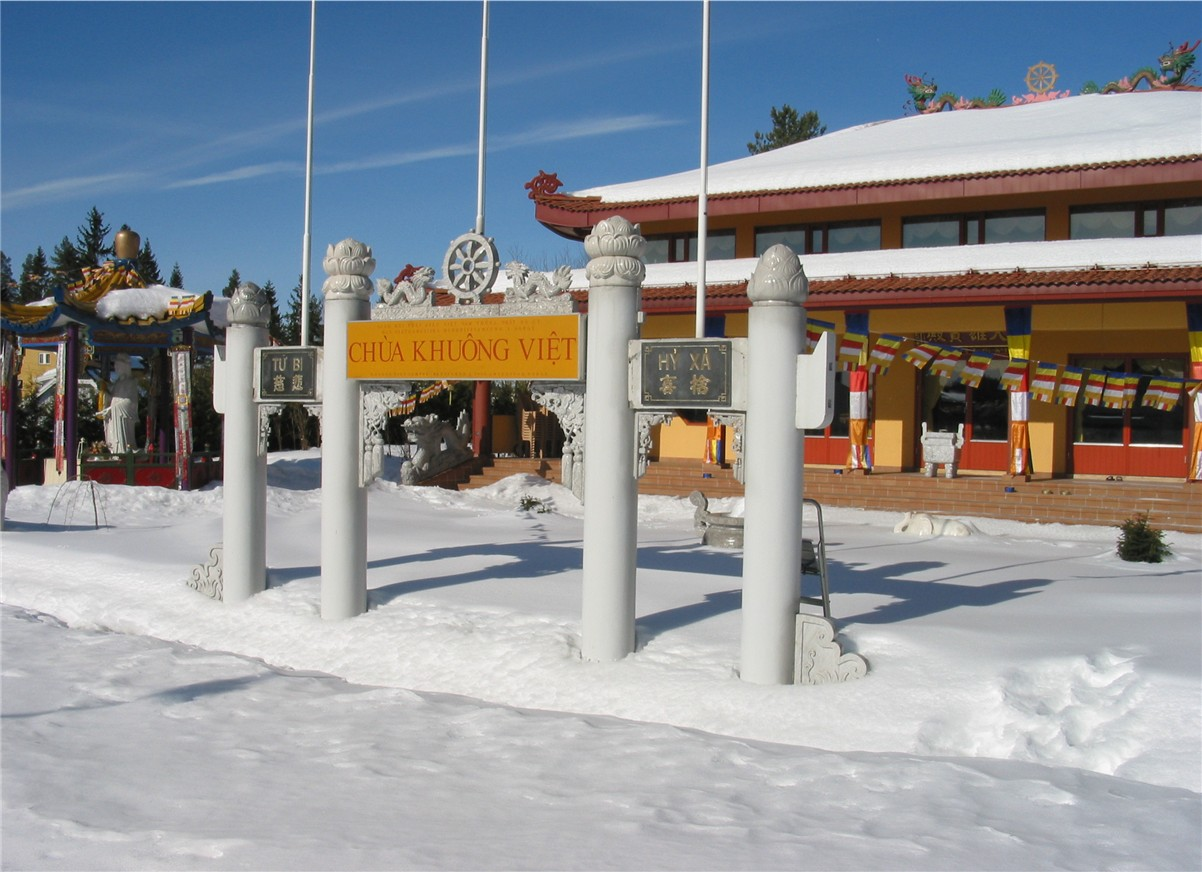
The Vietnamese "Khuông Việt" pagoda at Løvenstad near Oslo, the only of its kind in Norway.

Buddhism in Norway has existed since the beginning of the 1970s, after immigration from countries with Buddhist populations, mainly Vietnam. Buddhistforbundet (The Buddhist Federation) in Norway was established as a religious society in 1979 by two Buddhist groups (The Zen School and Karma Tashi Ling buddhistsenter) who wanted to create a common organization to preserve issues of common interest. As of 2013, there are between 30.000 and 50.000 (between 0.7% and up to 1% of the total population) registered Buddhists in Norway. Around 5% of them are Norwegians.

In 2017, it was estimated that there are approximately 2,000 ethnic Norwegians who have converted to the religion. Buddhism is Norway's third-largest religion, after Christianity and Islam.

== Population ==
=== By Electoral districts ===
Electoral districts	Total population	Buddhist population	Percent buddhist
Oslo	575,475	2,912	0.5%
Akershus	527,625	1,767	0.3%
Østfold	268,584	1,143	0.4%
Hordaland	469,681	952	0.2%
Rogaland	420,574	844	0.2%
Sør-Trøndelag	286,729	801	0.2%
Buskerud	254,634	774	0.3%
Vestfold	229,134	538	0.2%
Vest-Agder	168,233	512	0.3%
Telemark	167,548	379	0.2%
Hedmark	190,071	350	0.1%
Oppland	184,288	274	0.1%
Møre og Romsdal	248,727	246	0.0%
Aust-Agder	107,359	227	0.2%
Troms	155,553	177	0.1%
Nordland	235,380	131	0.0%
Nord-Trøndelag	130,708	104	0.0%
Finnmark	72,492	81	0.1%
Sogn og Fjordane	106,457	40	0.0%

=== By region ===
County	Total population	Buddhist population	Percent buddhist
Eastern Norway	2,397,359	8,137	0.3%
Western Norway	1,245,439	2,082	0.1%
Trøndelag	417,437	905	0.2%
Southern Norway	275,592	739	0.2%
Northern Norway	463,425	389	0.0%

Year	Buddhists	Percent
1990	3,012	0.07%
2000	7,031	0.16%
2005	9,471	0.20%
2010	13,376	0.27%
2019	21,555	0.40%
