= Sikhism in Norway =

Sikhism in Norway Sikhismen i Norge

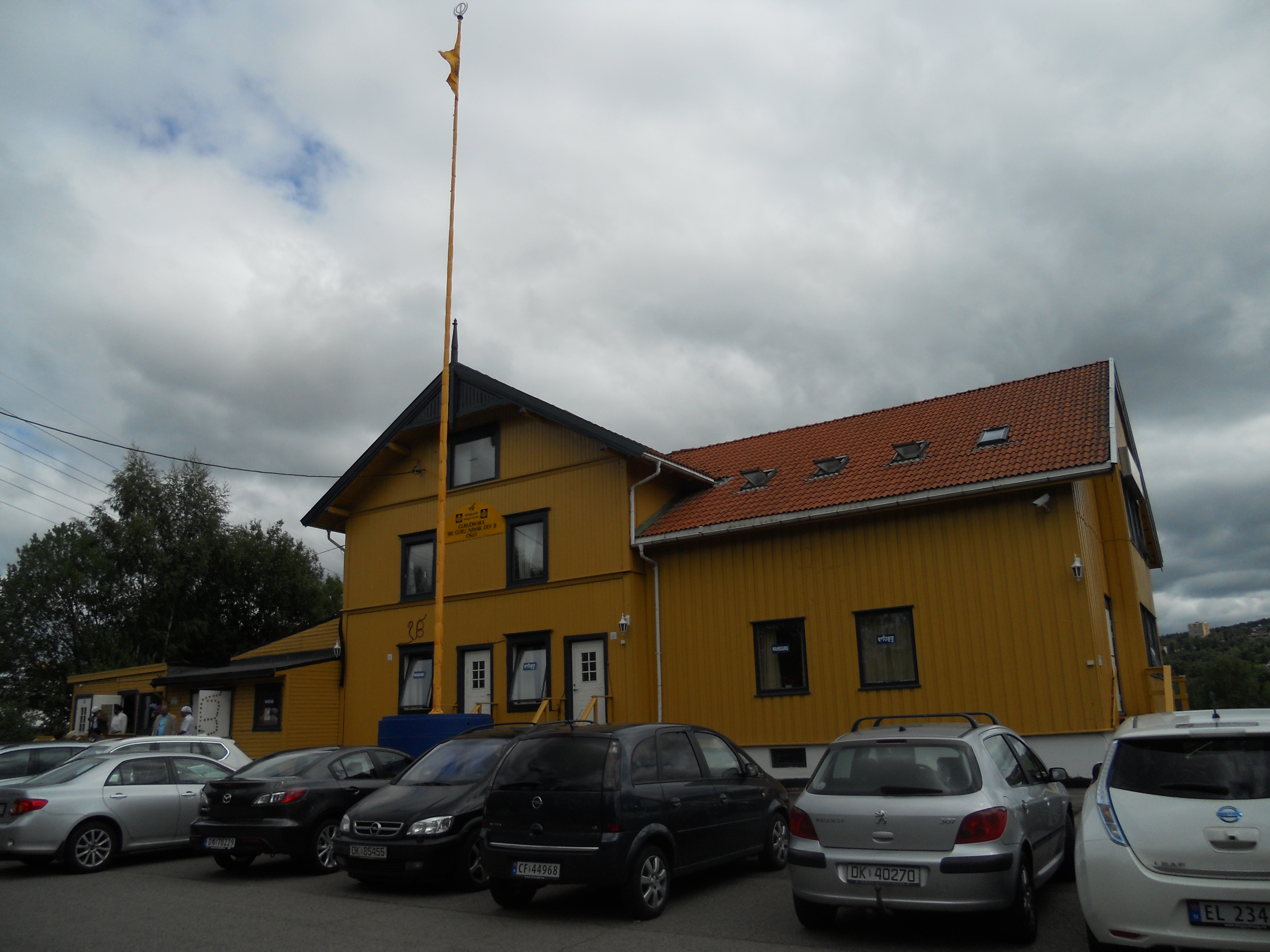
- Gurdwara Sri Guru Nanak Dev Ji, Alnabru, Oslo

Total population
- ~5,000

Regions with significant populations
- Oslo · Bergen

Languages
- Punjabi · Norwegian

In Norway, Sikhism has approximately 5,000 adherents, mostly living in Oslo. Oslo collectively has two gurdwaras (the Sikh place of worship).

== History ==
Sikhs first came to Norway in the early 1970s. In 1969, the first Sikh who arrived in and settled in Norway was Amarjit Singh Kamboj. Sikhs and other work-related immigrants from India to Norway founded The Indian Welfare Society of Norway (IWS) in 1971. The troubles in Punjab after Operation Blue Star and riots committed against Sikhs in India after the assassination of Indira Gandhi led to an increase in Sikh refugees moving to Norway and other countries. Drammen also has a sizeable population of Sikhs; the largest gurdwara in north Europe was built in Lier.

A Sikh organization, Ungesikher helps young Sikhs assimilate and has incentives to help make Sikhism better known.

To increase knowledge of Sikhs and their culture, a professor of science of religion, Knut A. Jacobsen, who works in the University of Bergen, published a textbook titled Sikhismen: historie tradisjon og kultur, in Norwegian for schools.
