= Eastern Orthodoxy in Norway =

Church

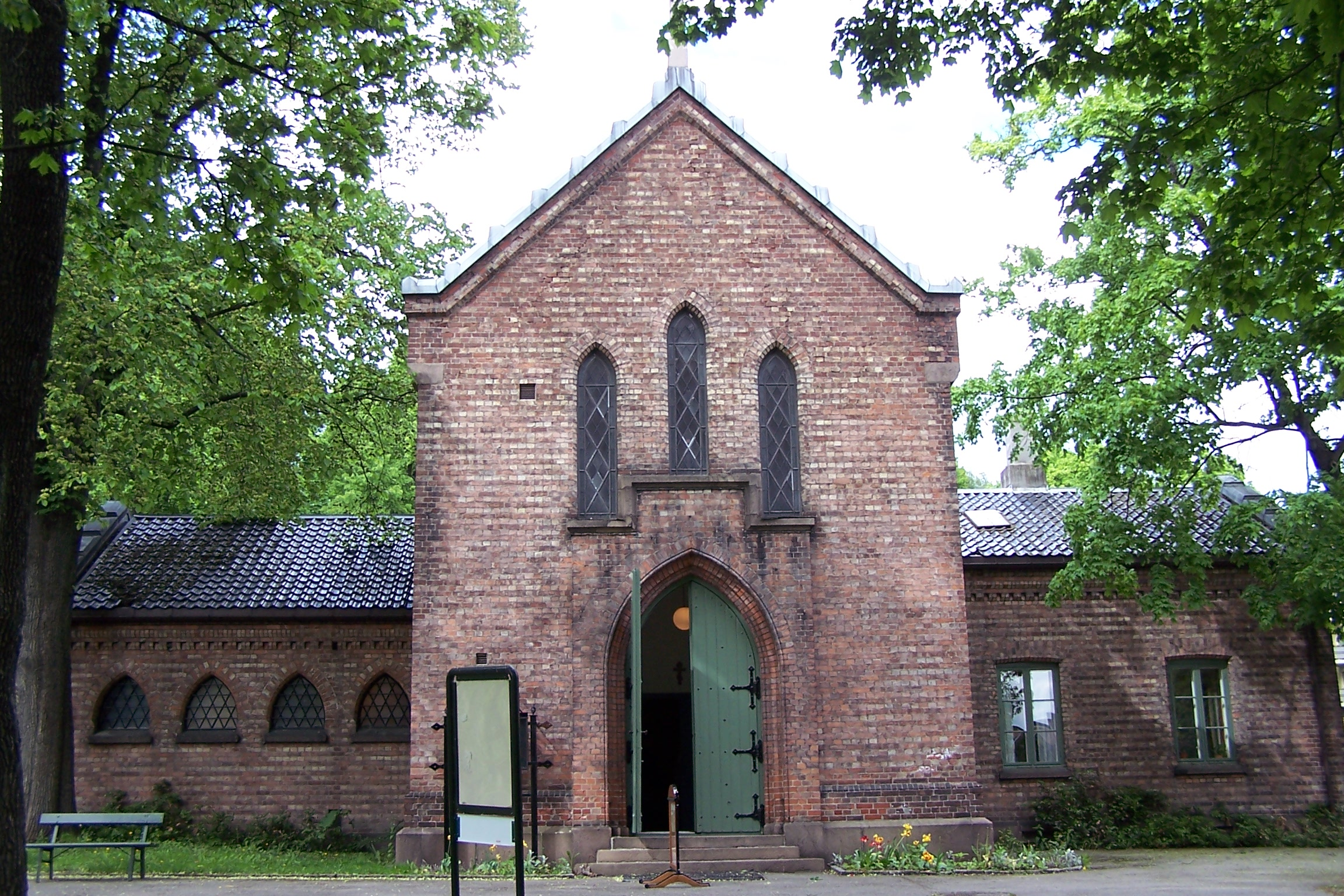
- Our Saviour's Orthodox Church in Oslo
- Classification: Eastern Orthodox Church
- Region: Norway
- Origin: 1931
- Members: 43,347 (including Oriental Orthodoxy) (Note: The cited Statistics Norway dataset seems to have tracked Norway's broader Orthodox population, which would have included Oriental Orthodoxy. It's unclear whether or not there's a reliable dataset that does made a distinction between the two (i.e. the Eastern and Oriental Orthodox populations of Norway))

Eastern Orthodoxy in Norway refers to the presence and history of the Eastern Orthodox Church in Norway. As of 2026, Norway's broader Orthodox population (including Oriental Orthodoxy) is 43,347.

During 2022, approximately 34,000 Ukrainians arrived in Norway after the 2022 invasion of Ukraine; it was estimated that approximately two-thirds of them identified as Orthodox.

== History of the Eastern Orthodox Church in Norway ==
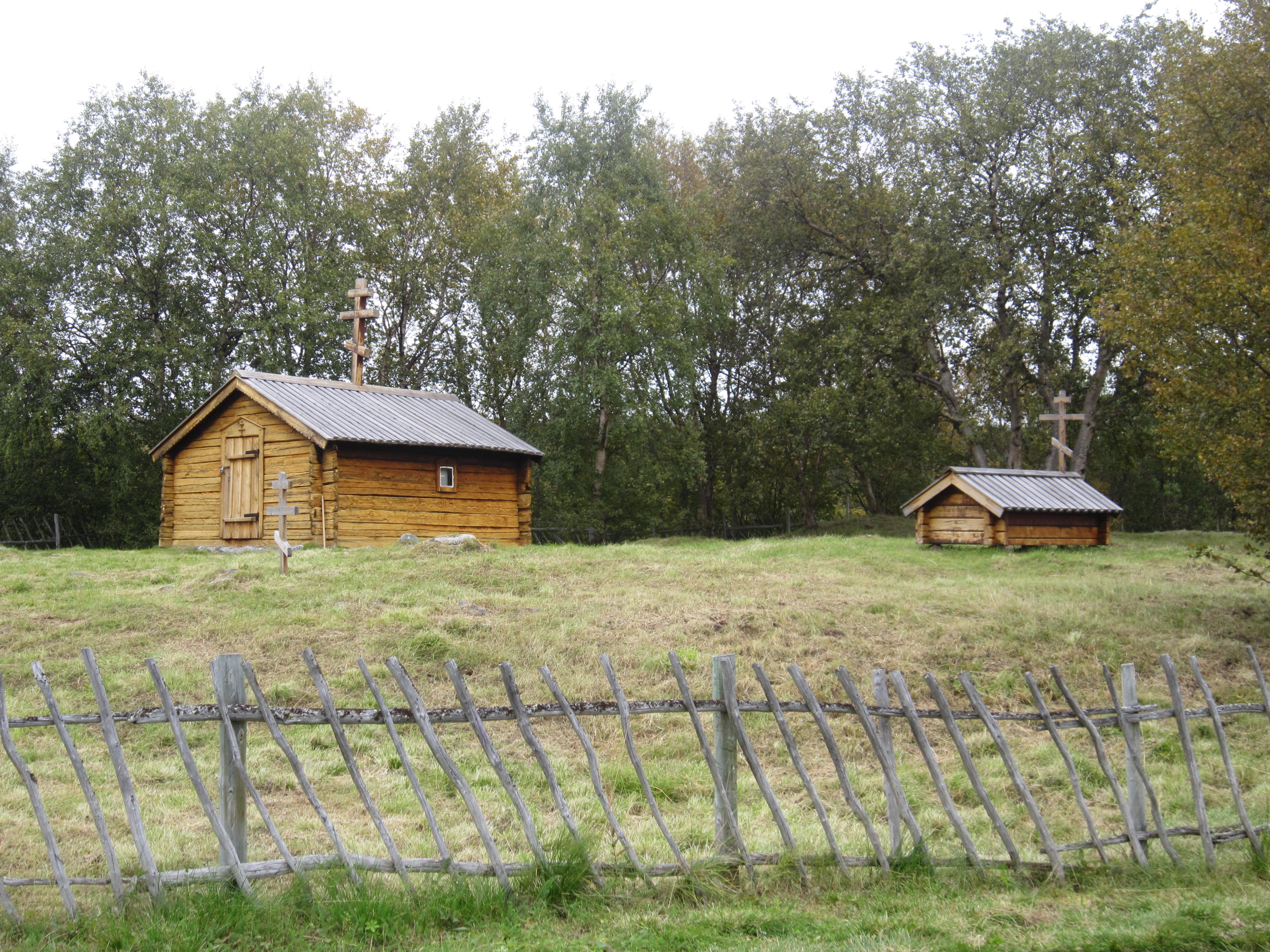
St. George's Chapel in Neiden, which is often associated with St. Tryphon of Pechenga.

Many Eastern Orthodox communities in Norway include the nation's pre-Great Schism Christian history in their heritage, seeing as Norway’s Christianization began before the Schism (for example, St. Olaf, who reigned as King of Norway from 1015–1028, is venerated as a pre-Schism saint in Eastern Orthodoxy, alongside St. Sunniva and St. Hallvard). This represents a theological claim about the prior unity of the Church rather than a historical claim about the distinct presence of Eastern Orthodoxy in pre-Schism Norway. This distinct presence (post-Schism) is often traced back to St. Tryphon of Pechenga, a Russian Orthodox monk who evangelized many of the Skolt Sámi and planted chapels in the Pasvik and Neiden areas in the 16th century.

As a result of the Russian Revolution and its aftermath, a number of Orthodox refugees from Russia fled to Scandinavia, first to Sweden and eventually to Norway. The Eastern Orthodox Church in Russia organized pastoral work among them through the church in Stockholm, founded in 1617. In 1931, St. Nikolai Orthodox Church was established in Oslo. This congregation of Russian tradition is under the jurisdiction of the Patriarchate of Constantinople and was the first modern Orthodox congregation established in Norway. The 1960s and 1970s saw an influx of Greek Orthodox Christians, in addition to the first known conversions of Norwegians in modern times. Immigration from Russia, the former Yugoslavia, and other Eastern European countries contributed to the number of Orthodox Christians in Norway following the Fall of Communism. The past decade has also seen the more permanent establishment of Orthodox communities of Serbian, Bulgarian and Romanian tradition, with their priests serving under their respective jurisdictions.

== The Ecumenical Patriarchate ==
The Patriarchal Exarchate for Orthodox Parishes of Russian Tradition in Western Europe has one priest in Norway, specifically in Oslo. There are several affiliate or missionary communities in Bergen and Stavanger.

=== The Greek Community ===
The primarily Greek congregation of the Annunciation of the Theotokos was founded in 1965 with main purpose of serving the Greek-speaking Orthodox community in Norway. This church is under the jurisdiction of Metropolitan Cleopas (Strongylis) of Sweden and all of Scandinavia, and is based in Stockholm. The congregation celebrates the Divine Liturgy approximately once a month through the services of Father Alexandros.

== The Serbian Patriarchate ==
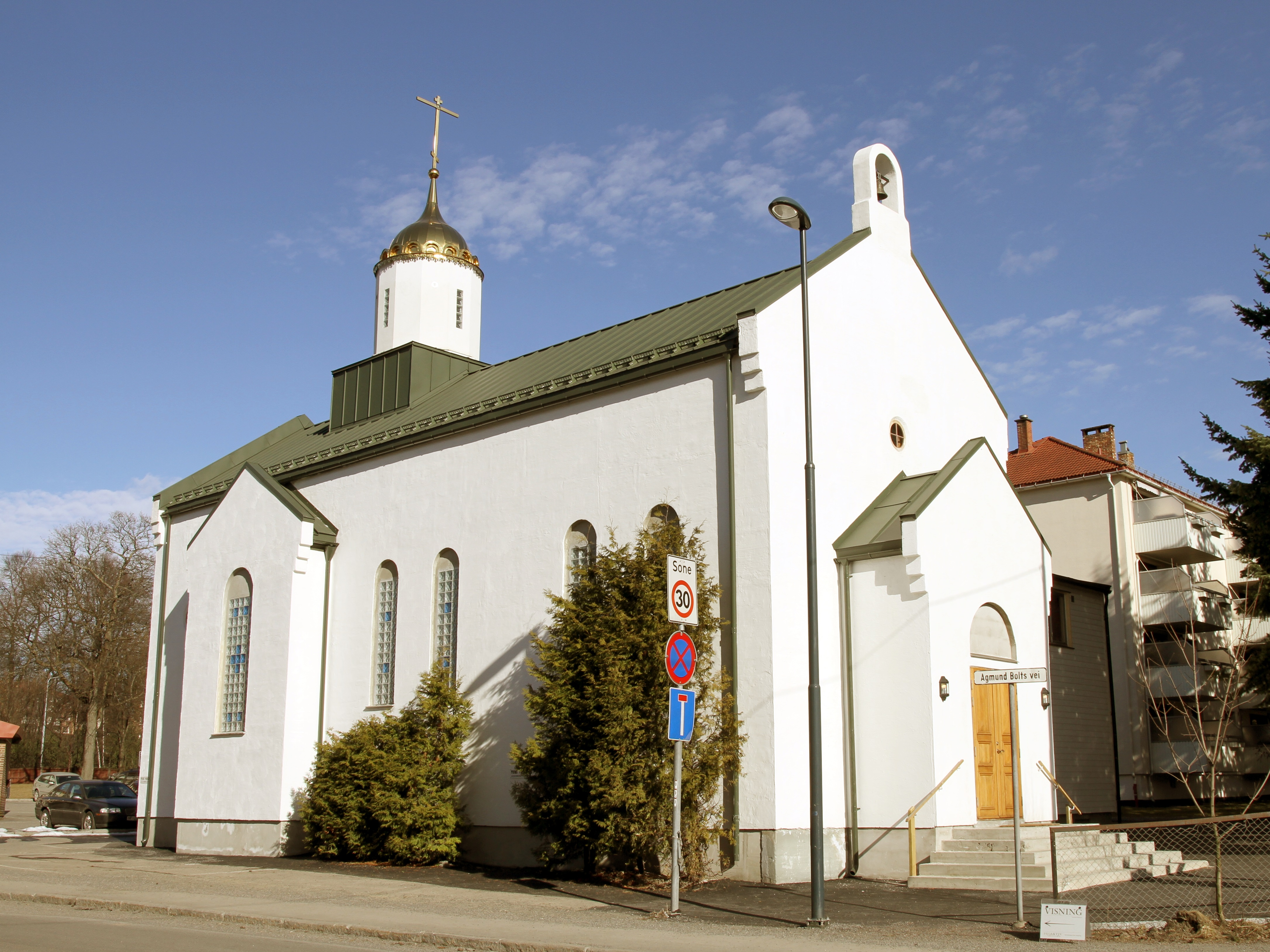
St. Nikolai Serbian Eastern Orthodox Church in Oslo

The first modern Orthodox congregation, St. Nikolai Orthodox Church, was formerly under the jurisdiction of the Patriarchal Exarchate for Orthodox Parishes of Russian Tradition in Western Europe but is now part of the Serbian Orthodox Church. While it adheres to the Russian or Slavic tradition, the Norwegian language is always used along with Slavonic and at times used exclusively. This reflects the missionary tradition of the Orthodox Church, as in for example the work of Sts. Cyril and Methodius, renowned for helping to create a local alphabet (Cyrillic) in order to translate both the Holy Bible as well as the various liturgical books of the Eastern Orthodox Church. as well St. George's chapel at Neiden. In addition there is a small skete dedicated to St. Tryphon of Pechenga, home to two monks.

== The Moscow Patriarchate ==
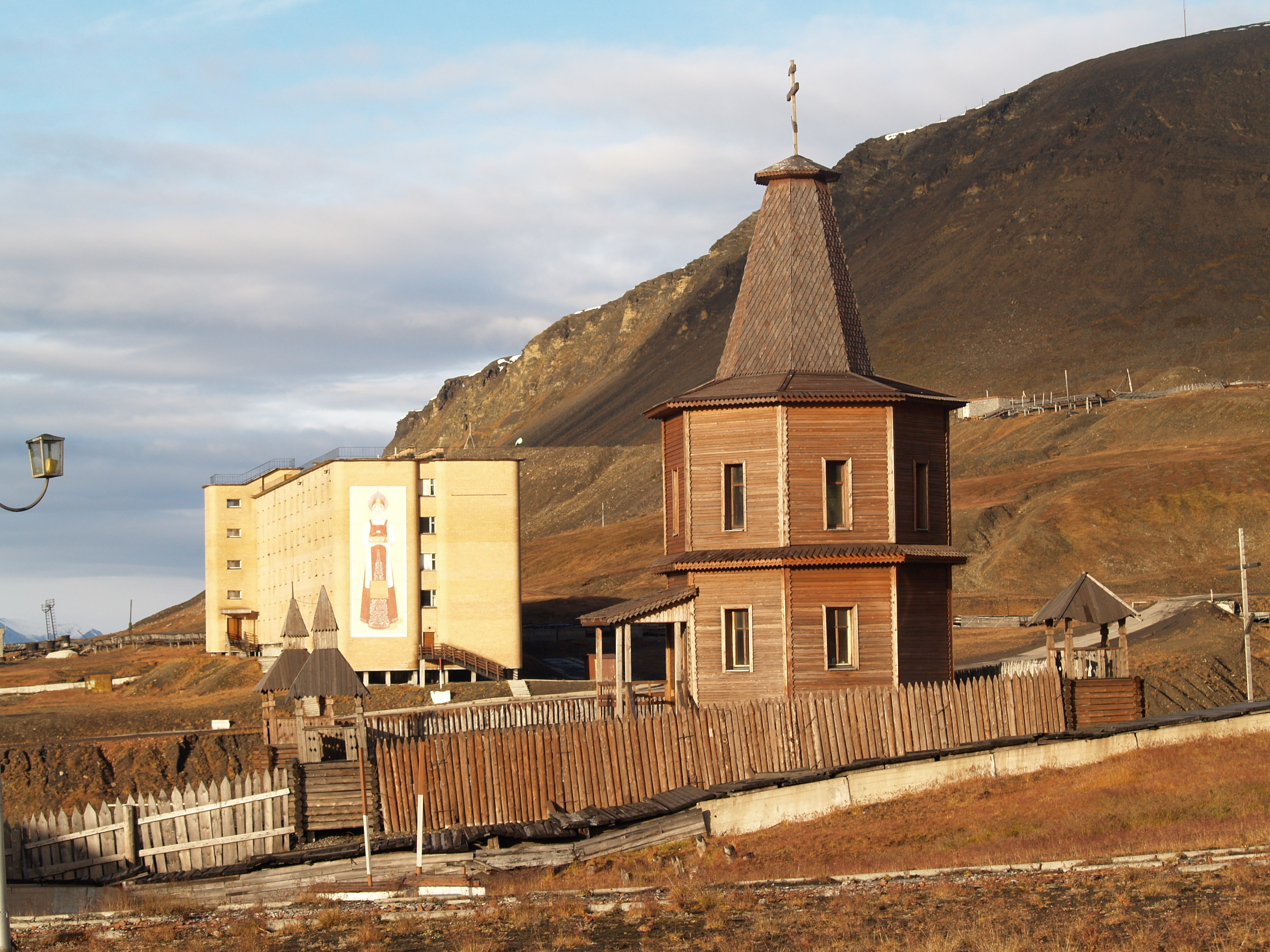
The Church in Barentsburg

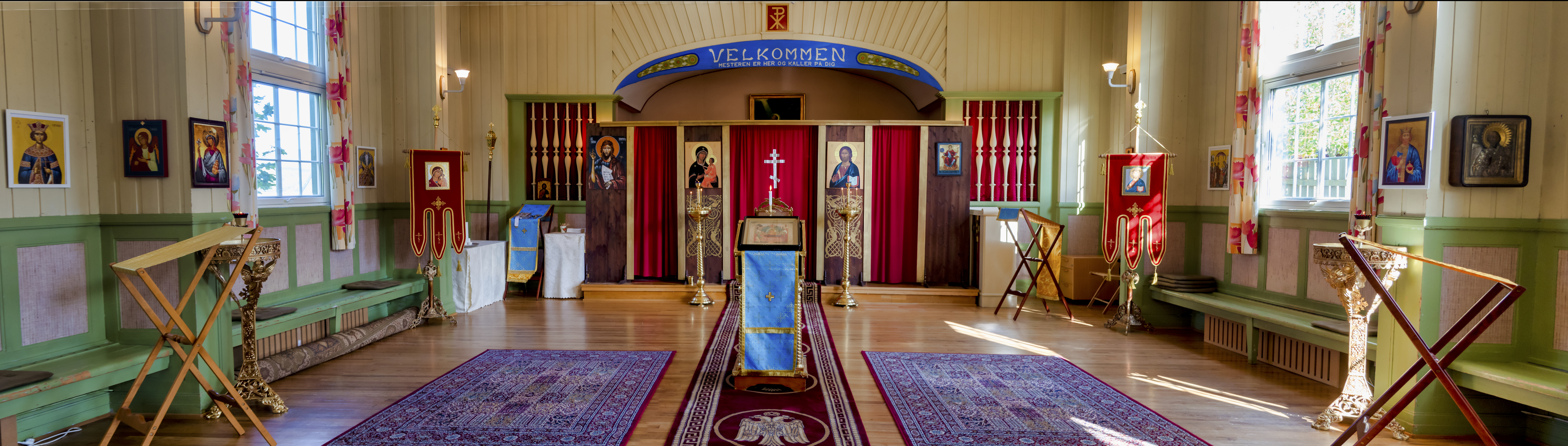
St.Hallvard Eastern Orthodox Church. Oslo.

The main parish of the Moscow Patriarchate, St. Olga's, was founded in Oslo in 1996. Today, there are also independent churches under the Moscow Patriarchate in Stavanger, Bergen, Trondheim and Kirkenes. In addition, the Moscow Patriarchate sponsors work in Tromsø and in the Russian settlement of Barentsburg on Svalbard. Russian communities in northern Norway have often been attended to by Russian clergymen of the Moscow Patriarchate.

There is two congregations under One in Oslo;

St.Hallvard Orthodox Parish, and The Annunciation of the Holy Virgin Mary Orthodox Parish in Bergen, both under Patriarchal Exarchate for Orthodox Parishes of Russian Tradition in Western Europe.

== Number of adherents ==
Year	Orthodox	Percent
1980	?	?
1990	1,222	0.02%
2000	2,315	0.05%
2005	5,028	0.10%
2010	8,492	0.17%
2011	9,894	0.20%
2012	11,205	0.22%
2013-2019	?	?
2020	28.544	0,53%
2024	36,498	0,66%

== See also ==
- Religion in Norway
- Christianity in Norway
- Catholic Church in Norway
- Protestantism in Norway
