= Buddhist Federation of Norway =

The Buddhist Federation of Norway (Norwegian: Buddhistforbundet) is an umbrella organization for the different Buddhist groups in Norway. It was founded in 1979 by two Buddhist groups (Rinzai Zen Senter and Karma Tashi Ling buddhistsamfunn) with the aim of creating an organization to deal with issues of common interest for all Norwegian Buddhists, and which could represent all the separate groups to the government. The main goal of Buddhistforbundet today is to foster communication and good relations between Buddhists of all traditions and groups, in order to promote Buddhist principles and practice in Norway.

== Organizations within Buddhistforbundet ==
- Buddhasasana - Organization for those with an interest in the Theravada tradition
- Den thailandske buddhistforening - Organization building a Thai buddhist temple in Frogner
- Oslo buddhistsenter - In Oslo
- Det vietnamesiske buddhistsamfunn - A nationwide Vietnamese Buddhist community
- Dharmagruppen - Organization practicing meditation as taught by Nhat Hanh
- Dharma Sah - A group in Moss associated with the Lotus Sangha of World Social Buddhism
- Hridaya-gruppen - A Zen group in Oslo
- Karma Tashi Ling buddhistsamfunn - A community practicing Tibetan Buddhism
- Rinzai Zen Senter - A Japanese Zen centre in Oslo
- Stavanger buddhistiske forening - A meditation group in Stavanger, established April 29, 1998
- Tisarana - The Sri Lankan Buddhist association in Norway
- 'Den Burmesiske Theravada Buddhist Forrening' at Kløfta in Norway,
