= Oriental Orthodoxy in Norway =

There is a fast-growing Oriental Church in Bergen, Norway, named Saint Michael's Orthodox Church, with 147 members in 2010 (up from 98 in 2009). It is almost exclusively made up of Ethiopians and Eritreans. The number of Eritreans in Norway grew from 813 in 2000 to 7,728 in 2010, while the number of Ethiopians grew from 2,803 to 5,805.
