= Contemporary Catholic liturgical music =

Variety of styles of music

Contemporary Catholic liturgical music encompasses a comprehensive variety of styles of music for Catholic liturgy that grew both before and after the reforms of the Second Vatican Council (Vatican II). The dominant style in English-speaking Canada and the United States began as Gregorian chant and folk hymns, superseded after the 1970s by a folk-based musical genre, generally acoustic and often slow in tempo, but that has evolved into a broad contemporary range of styles reflective of certain aspects of age, culture, and language. There is a marked difference between this style and those that were both common and valued in Catholic churches before Vatican II.

== History ==
=== Background ===
In the early 1950s the Jesuit priest Joseph Gelineau was active in liturgical development in several movements leading toward Vatican II. The new Gelineau psalmody was published in French (1953) and English (1963).

==== Vatican II ====
Contemporary Catholic liturgical music grew after the reforms that followed the Second Vatican Council, which called for wider use of the vernacular language in the Catholic Mass. The General Instruction of the Roman Missal states:

Great importance should ... be attached to the use of singing in the celebration of the Mass, with due consideration for the culture of the people and abilities of each liturgical assembly. Although it is not always necessary (e.g. in weekday Masses) to sing all the texts that are of themselves meant to be sung, every care should be taken that singing by the ministers and the people is not absent in celebrations that occur on Sundays and on holy days of obligation.

It adds:

All other things being equal, Gregorian chant holds pride of place because it is proper to the Roman Liturgy. Other types of sacred music, in particular polyphony, are in no way excluded, provided that they correspond to the spirit of the liturgical action and that they foster the participation of all the faithful. Since the faithful from different countries come together ever more frequently, it is fitting that they know how to sing together at least some parts of the Ordinary of the Mass in Latin, especially the Creed and the Lord's Prayer, set to the simpler melodies.

=== English Masses ===
One of the first English language Masses was of Gregorian chant style. It was created by DePaul University graduate Dennis Fitzpatrick and entitled "Demonstration English Mass". Fitzpatrick composed and recorded it on vinyl in mid-1963. He distributed it to many of the US bishops who were returning from a break in the Second Vatican Council. The Mass was well received by many US Catholic cleric and is said to have furthered their acceptance of Sacrosanctum Concilium.

Mary Lou Williams, a Black Catholic composer, had completed her own Mass, Black Christ of the Andes (also known as Mary Lou's Mass) in 1962 and performed it that November at St. Francis Xavier Church in Manhattan. She recorded it in October of the next year. It was based around a hymn in honor of the Peruvian saint Martin de Porres, two other short works, "Anima Christi" and "Praise the Lord".

The first official Mass in English in the United States was held during the 1964 National Liturgical Conference in St Louis. The Communion Hymn was Clarence Rivers' "God is Love", which combined Gregorian Chant with the melodic patterns and rhythms of Negro Spirituals. It received a 10-minute standing ovation. Rivers would go on to play a major role in the Black Catholic Movement, wherein the "Gospel Mass" tradition took hold in Black Catholic parishes and introduced Black gospel music to the larger Catholic world. Other major players in this movement included Thea Bowman, James P. Lyke, George Clements, George Stallings Jr., and William "Bill" Norvel.

The revision of music in the liturgy took place in March 1967, with the passage of Musicam Sacram ("Instruction on music in the liturgy"). In paragraph 46 of this document, it states that music could be played during the sacred liturgy on "instruments characteristic of a particular people." Previously the pipe organ was used for accompaniment. The use of instruments native to the culture was an important step in the multiplication of songs written to accompany the Catholic liturgy.

In addition to his role in creating this first English language Mass, Dennis had a large stake in F.E.L. (Friends of the English Liturgy). Many of the contemporary artists who authored the folk music that was used in American Catholic Liturgy choose F.E.L. to be their publisher, as did Ray Repp, who pioneered contemporary Catholic liturgical music and authored the "First Mass for Young Americans", a suite of folk-style musical pieces designed for the Catholic liturgy. Repp gave an impetus to the development of "guitar masses".

== Musical style ==
The musical style of 21st-century Catholic music varies greatly. Much of it is composed so that choir and assembly can be accompanied by organ, piano, or guitar. More recently, due to style preferences and cost, trends show fewer and fewer parishes use the traditional pipe organ, therefore this music has generally been written for chorus with piano, guitar, and/or percussion accompaniment.

The vernacular Mass texts have also drawn composers who stand outside the dominant folk–popular music tradition, such as Giancarlo Menotti and Richard Proulx.

== Popular composers ==
American composers of this music, with some of their most well known compositions, include:

- Alexander Peloquin, 1918–1997. He composed the first Mass setting sung in English, and had over 150 published Masses and other pieces.
- Miguel del Aguila, b. 1957. Several Mass settings, Ave Maria, Salva me, Agnus Dei, Requiem Mass.
- Marty Haugen, b. 1950 ("Gather Us In", "Canticle of the Sun", "We Are Many Parts", many psalm settings)
- Michael Joncas, b. 1951 (On Eagle's Wings, "We Come to Your Feast")
- John Michael Talbot, b. 1954 (Songs for Worship, Vols. 1 and 2)
- David Haas, b. 1957 ("Blest Are They", "You Are Mine")
- James E. Moore Jr., 1951-2022 ("Taste and See")
- Clarence Rivers, 1931-2004 ("God Is Love", "Glory to God, Glory", Mass Dedicated to the Brotherhood of Man)
- Mary Lou Williams, 1910-1981 ("Mary Lou's Mass", "Praise the Lord", "Black Christ of the Andes")
- Eddie Bonnemère, 1921-1996 (""Missa Hodierna", "Help Me, Jesus")
- Carey Landry, b. 1945 ("Abba, Father", "Hail Mary, Gentle Woman")
- The Dameans, Gary Ault, Mike Balhoff, Buddy Ceaser, Gary Daigle, Darryl Ducote ("Look Beyond", "All That We Have", Remember Your Love")
- Dan Schutte, b. 1947 ("Here I Am, Lord", "Sing a New Song", "You Are Near")
- Bob Dufford, b. 1943 ("Be Not Afraid", "All the Ends of the Earth")
- John Foley, b. 1939 ("One Bread, One Body")
- Janet Mead, 1938–2022 ("Lord's Prayer")

Notable composers of contemporary Catholic liturgical music from outside the US include:

- Irish Ian Callanan, b. 1971 ("Comfort My People", "Take and Eat, This Is My Body", "Love Is the Boat for the Journey")
- Frenchman Lucien Deiss, 1921-2007 ("Keep in Mind")
- Frenchman Joseph Gelineau, 1920-2008 ("The Lord Is My Shepherd")
- Australian Richard Connolly, b.1927 ("Where there is charity and love")
- English Damian Lundy ("Sing of a Girl", "Walk in the Light")
- English Bernadette Farrell, b. 1957 ("Unless a Grain of Wheat", "Christ Be Our Light")
- English Paul Inwood, b. 1947 ("Center of my Life")
- English Anne Quigley b. 1955 or 1956 ("There is a Longing")
- Filipino Eduardo Hontiveros, 1923–2008
- Filipino Ryan Cayabyab, b.1954 ("Kordero Ng Diyos", "Santo", "Panginoon Maawa Ka")
- Spanish Cesáreo Gabaráin, 1936-1991 ("Fisher of Men", "Lord, You Have Come to the Lakeshore": Roman Catholic composer, Gold Record in Spain)

== Publishers ==
A significant percentage of American contemporary liturgical music has been published under the names of three publishers: Oregon Catholic Press (OCP), Gregorian Institute of America (GIA), and World Library Publications (WLP, the music and liturgy division of the J.S. Paluch company).

Oregon Catholic Press (OCP) is a not-for-profit affiliation of the Archdiocese of Portland. Archbishop Alexander K. Sample of Portland is de facto head of OCP. Archbishop Sample is the eleventh bishop of the Archdiocese of Portland and was installed on April 2, 2013. Cardinal William Levada who became Prefect for the Congregation for the Doctrine of the Faith in the Roman Curia was a former member of the board of directors. Levada as Archbishop of Portland (1986–1995) led OCP during its expansive growth, and this style of music became the principal style among many English-speaking communities. Francis George, prior to becoming Archbishop of Chicago and cardinal, was also Archbishop of Portland and de facto head of OCP. OCP grew to represent approximately two-thirds of Catholic liturgical music market sales.

== Criticism ==
Contemporary music aims to enable the entire congregation to take part in the song, in accord with the call in Sacrosanctum Concilium for full, conscious, active participation of the congregation during the Eucharistic celebration. What its advocates call a direct and accessible style of music gives participation of the gathered community higher priority than the beauty added to the liturgy by a choir skilled in polyphony.

Music for worship, according to the U.S. Conference of Catholic Bishops, is to be judged by three sets of criteria – pastoral, liturgical, and musical, with the place of honor accorded to Gregorian chant and the organ. On this basis it has been argued that the adoption of the more popular musical styles is alien to the Roman Rite, and weakens the distinctiveness of Catholic worship. This style contrasts with the traditional form where the congregation sings to God.

Musicam Sacram, a 1967 document from the Second Vatican Council said to govern the use of sacred music, states that "those instruments which are, by common opinion and use, suitable for secular music only, are to be altogether prohibited from every liturgical celebration and from popular devotions". Pundit George Weigel said that "[a]n extraordinary number of trashy liturgical hymns have been written in the years since the Second Vatican Council." Weigel called "Ashes" a "prime example" of "[h]ymns that teach heresy", criticizing the lyric "We rise again from ashes to create ourselves anew" as "Pelagian drivel".

== See also ==
- Women composers of Catholic music
