= The Dameans =

Catholic seminarians who formed a folk music group in 1967

- Origin: New Orleans, Louisiana
- Genres: Contemporary Catholic liturgical music
- Years active: 1967-1995, last recording. Active on occasion. Recently, 2012; In the summer of 2018, the Dameans reunited for a 50th anniversary concert.
- Labels: F.E.L. Publications, TeleKetics, NALR, GIA
- Past members: Darryl Ducote; Mike Balhoff; Dave Baker (1969-1971); Buddy Ceasar; Gary Ault; Gary Daigle (since 1978); Bobby Morgan (prior to 1969); Charles Monzelun (prior to 1969)

The Dameans were a group of Catholic musicians who rose to prominence in the folk music era of the 1970s. They began as seminarians at Notre Dame Seminary in New Orleans, Louisiana, having formed circa 1967.

== History ==
The group was composed mainly of Darryl Ducote, Mike Balhoff, Dave Baker, Buddy Ceasar, and Gary Ault. Two other seminarians participated in The Dameans early-on: Bobby Morgan and Charles Monzelun. Bobby and Charles were part of the Notre Dame Seminary Trio, formed by Gary Ault. Darryl Ducote joined the group as their lead singer. Mike Balhoff joined as their bassist. Through a closure and combining of seminaries in Louisiana, Gary, Darryl, and Mike asked the others to join them and The Dameans were founded. After Bobby Morgan and Charles Monzelun left the seminary, the other five members chose to continue on. Gary Ault had previously worked with Carey Landry, a liturgical singer and songwriter as well. They billed themselves as "Gary and Carey".

For several years, The Dameans traveled around the United States, doing concerts and workshops/presentations. When they began to travel, these men selected a name for the group and decided that they could have "five members" because that is "how many a car would hold." They had to have enough room for themselves and their luggage, along with their guitars, and even "room for a bass fiddle"

All of the Dameans contributed to vocals to varying degrees, with Darryl, Buddy, and Gary singing lead on most songs. All of these men contributed to the songwriting. Darryl, Buddy, and Gary frequently wrote lyrics and music for their songs. Mike is more of a lyricist and worked often as a co-writer with Darryl. Dave also contributed a song to the third album. Though they only played their own instruments on their first album, they are mainly guitarists (Darryl, Buddy, and Gary) with Mike playing upright bass and Dave adding tambourine. On all albums after "Tell The World", studio musicians have been used.

Following the 1971 "Walk To The Gloryland" album, Dave Baker left the group. According to Darryl in a recent interview, Dave bowed out of the group because the traveling was too difficult and his home was in Wisconsin. Darryl mentioned that until 1970, The Dameans spent every weekend on the road with their music ministry. After they were ordained priests, the travel reduced to once a month with the blessing of their bishops. Traveling took them to 48 states, including Hawaii and Alaska.,

Around 1978, a young Gary Daigle joined the group with the release of "Remember Your Love." Gary Daigle played keyboards and guitar, as well as taking an active role in songwriting.

By the early 1980s, along with such groups as the St. Louis Jesuits, The Dameans' music "dominate[d] the publications scene" in contemporary Catholic liturgical music. As part of the "second phase" of post-Conciliar Catholic folk music, the Dameans' songs reflected attention to liturgical and Biblical texts, and several were represented in the original Glory and Praise hymnals, Volume 2 of 1979 and Volume 3, 1981. Their most popular songs included Look Beyond and All That We Have.

The Dameans performed together on stage at a conference in 2012. This performance included Gary Daigle on keyboards, acoustic guitar, and backing vocals. Darryl leads the group in a never-recorded novelty Christmas song that he wrote in the early 1970s for a friend of his who enjoyed country music.

In 2018, The Dameans reunited for a concert to celebrate 50 years of making music together. Darryl, Gary, Mike, Buddy, and Gary appeared on stage with many of the musicians who appeared on their recordings through the years. They introduced David Baker as being in the audience. They also mentioned that Bobby Morgan was in the audience that night. They mentioned that Charles Monzelun's sister was in the audience representing him.

== Discography ==
- Tell The World (1969) - F.E.L. Publications, recorded at Woodland Studios, Nashville, TN - recorded entirely in one day, with the members contributing acoustic guitars, upright bass, and tambourine. Ray Tate, producer for the album, added some lead guitar overdubs.
- Songs of the New Creation (1970) - F.E.L. Publications, recorded at Paragon Studios, Chicago, IL (820 West Fulton Market, now defunct) - this recording and all that followed it used studio musicians, allowing the group members to focus on vocals.
- Walk To That Gloryland (1971) - F.E.L. Publications, recorded at RCA Studios, Los Angeles, CA. Though the album featured very talented studio musicians including Larry Knechtel ("Bridge Over Troubled Water" pianist) and guitarist Tommy Tedesco, the group members greatly disliked the arrangements of their songs that the producer had worked on and recorded without their input. They had very little say in how the recordings would sound. Original member David Baker left the group following this recording due to the constraints of traveling from his home in Wisconsin.
- Beginning Today (1973) - TeleKetics, recorded at TTG Studios, 1669 N McCadden Place, North Hollywood, CA (now defunct); Israel Baker, concert master
- Day of The Son (1976) - North American Liturgy Resources, recorded at Sea-Saint Studios, New Orleans, LA. This recording included several settings for use in the Catholic liturgy: Darryl's "Open Our Ears" became a popular gospel acclamation; Buddy and Gary contributed settings for the Holy, Holy; Buddy also included a Great Amen; Gary's "Peace Of The Lord" became a popular musical background for the Sign of Peace; Gary also included a version of the Lord's Prayer.
- Remember Your Love (1978) - North American Liturgy Resources, recorded at Sea-Saint Studios, New Orleans, LA. According to Mike Balhoff, this recording began as a series of responsorial psalms that he wrote lyrics for following a back injury. Mike's lyrics evolved into songs with Darryl and Gary Daigle working on the musical arrangements. These songs were arranged for church musicians to use as a Psalm or as a full song. Buddy contributed two of his songs to the project ... Love Is Forever (Jesus' words to His Father in John 17) and Emmanuel (Advent season). A popular gospel acclamation from Gary was included ... "speak, Lord, I'm listening; plant your word down deep in me."
- Sing Out His Goodness (1979) - North American Liturgy Resources, recorded at Sea-Saint Studios, New Orleans, LA; the Dameans re-recorded their earlier works with studio musicians, updated lyrics, and more contemporary arrangements. "Service" by Buddy Ceasar was greatly rewritten lyrically .
- Path Of Life (1981) - North American Liturgy Resources. This album featured songs and themes associated with the newly-founded Rite of Christian Initiation of Adults (RCIA).
- Reflections, Vol. 1 (1982) - North American Liturgy Resources (instrumental arrangements of Damean songs)
- Morning to Night (1984) - North American Liturgy Resources. The members of the group had moved to different parts of the country and held writing sessions at their different homes.
- Reflections, Vol. 2 (1985) - North American Liturgy Resources (instrumental arrangements of Damean songs)
- Light In The Darkness (1986) - North American Liturgy Resources. This albums features more contemporary songs for the Advent and Christmas season. Recorded at the former Ultrasonic Studios in New Orleans, LA and mastered at Artisan Sound Recorders in Hollywood, CA by Greg Fulginiti. From the cassette inlay card ... Produced by the Dameans, with Gary Daigle. Arrangements by Wardell Quezergue, Gary Daigle, and the Dameans. Bass: Everett Link; drums: Randy Carpenter; keyboards: Gary Daigle, George Bitzer; Saxophone: Don Evans, Tony Dagradi; Clarinet: Karen Catoire; Oboe: Roger Wattam; Bassoon: Bill Ludwig; Flutes: Tren Alford; French horn: Ralph Pottle; Trombone: Ron Nethercutt; Trumpet: Bobby Campo, Blake Daniels; Guitars: Gary Daigle; Choir: Steve Daigle, Brian Stratton, Robert Denn, Victor Cenales, Jana Fulda, Sue Pottle, Lee Ann Stewart, Leslie Jones, and Maria Daigle; Engineered by Jay Gallagher/assisted by Scott Goudeau; Jacket Art: Wolf Boehnke.
- Reflections, Vol. 3 (1986) - North American Liturgy Resources (instrumental arrangements of Damean songs)
- Intermissions (1988) - North American Liturgy Resources. Scripture passages interwoven with prayer and instrumental/vocal music.
- Reflections, Vol. 4 (1991) - GIA Publications (instrumental arrangements of Damean songs, Gary Daigle plays all instruments on this recording)
- Psalms For The Church Year, Volume VI (1993) - GIA Publications; Dameans participate as songwriters and vocals on their songs; other authors appear on this recording)
- Child of God (1995) - GIA Publications; one new song by Gary Ault; children join the Dameans in re-recordings of their songs. Gary Daigle handled the arrangements and provided most of the music.
