= Dan Schutte =

American Christian singer

- Dan Schutte, March 2007

Background information
- Born: Daniel Laurent Schutte; December 28, 1947 (age 78); Neenah, Wisconsin
- Genres: Contemporary Catholic liturgical music
- Occupations: Composer-in-Residence – University of San Francisco, Composer, Songwriter, Liturgist, Author
- Instruments: Piano, acoustic guitar
- Years active: 1974 – present
- Label: OCP Publications
- Website: www.danschuttemusic.com

Daniel Laurent Schutte (Note: Pronounced /ˈʃuːti/ SHOO-ti) is an American composer of Catholic and contemporary Christian liturgical music. He is best known for composing the hymn "Here I Am, Lord" (1981, also known as "I, the Lord of Sea and Sky") and approximately 171 other hymns and Mass settings. He was also formerly a Jesuit priest.

== Biography ==
Schutte was born in Neenah, Wisconsin, on December 28, 1947, grew up in Elm Grove, Wisconsin, and graduated from Marquette University High School before entering the Society of Jesus.

As a Jesuit seminarian, he was one of the founding members of the St. Louis Jesuits, composers who popularized a contemporary style of church music set to sacred texts sung in English due to the liturgical reforms initiated by the Second Vatican Council. Other members of the St. Louis Jesuits are Bob Dufford, Roc O'Connor, John Foley, and Tim Manion. Schutte was ordained to the priesthood but left the Jesuits in 1986.

He released ten collections with the St. Louis Jesuits, including a 30th-anniversary collection in 2005. Their second recording, Earthen Vessels, sold over one million albums. As a result, beginning with hymnals such as Glory and Praise, their music became standard repertoire in Catholic parishes in the English-speaking world.

Schutte continues as a prolific composer of liturgical music, releasing nine solo collections with OCP Publications. Many of his newer compositions found their way into permanent hymnals and missals. Schutte's "Mass of Christ the Savior," released in 2012, quickly became one of the most widely used Mass Settings throughout the English-speaking world.

Notable Christian artists, including Chris Christian, Amy Grant, and John Michael Talbot, have recorded his compositions. His music is credited in movie and television soundtracks, including Dark Waters, Yes, God, Yes, Everybody Loves Raymond, Will and Grace, and Mistresses.

In 2009, he wrote Walking the Sacred Path – Spiritual Exercises for Today, 2012, God With Us - A Prayer Book For Advent and Christmas and, 2014, From Ashes To Glory - A Prayer Book For Lent and Easter. With the outbreak of COVID-19, he developed a series of virtual spiritual retreats that gained a worldwide audience.

In addition to his Jesuit formation, Schutte holds two master of arts degrees, one in theology and one in liturgy, from The Jesuit School of Theology at Berkeley. Schutte is also an alumnus of St. Louis University and Seattle University. He did graduate studies in music composition under the direction of Fr. Kevin Waters S.J. at Seattle University. He was a student of celebrated American painter and artist, Sr. Thomasita Fessler, OSF at Studio San Damiano. He has received four honorary doctoral degrees for his contribution to the life of the church. Two honorary doctorates are in humane letters, and two are in music.

Schutte presently is Composer-in-Residence at the University of San Francisco. He continues to compose new music and write about spirituality.

== Legacy ==
Schutte's compositions are primarily written for Catholic liturgical use, but over time have been used in Protestant worship. Some of the more notable include "City of God" (1981), "Only This I Want" (1981), "Blest Be the Lord" (1976), "You Are Near" (1971), "Though the Mountains May Fall" (1975), "Sing a New Song" (1972), "Glory and Praise to Our God" (1976), "Here I Am, Lord" (1981), "Table of Plenty" (1992), "River of Glory" (2001), "These Alone Are Enough" (2004), his setting of the Ignatian Suscipe prayer and "Saints and Beloved of God" (2016).

"The St. Louis Jesuit Mass" (1973), co-authored during his collaborative years, was the most-used Mass setting in the United States during the 1970s and 1980s. With the implementation of the Roman Missal, Third Edition in 2012, it wasn't easy to revise the original Mass setting text and well-known melody with the new style of the translation, which follow the original Latin texts more closely. The Publisher and composers decided not to publish a revision. "Mass of Christ the Savior," released in 2012, quickly became one of the most widely used Mass Settings throughout the English-speaking world.

In a circular of July 29, 2008, the Congregation for Divine Worship directed that "in liturgical celebrations, in songs and prayers the name of God in the form of the tetragrammaton YHWH is neither to be used or pronounced." Schutte agreed with the directive. Accordingly, for Catholic liturgical services, the refrain of Schutte's "You Are Near," which began as "Yahweh, I know you are near" now begins with "O Lord, I know you are near."

== Honors and recognition ==
- Doctor of Humane Letters, Honoris Causa, University of Scranton, 1980.
- Doctor of Music, Honoris Causa, Creighton University, 2006.
- Doctor of Humane Letters, Honoris Causa, University of San Francisco, 2009.
- Doctor of Music, Honoris Causa, St Louis University, 2021
- Grammy Awards - four nominations for St. Louis Jesuits, 1976, 1977, 1978, and 1981.
- Distinguished Alumni Award, Seattle University, 1983.
- Alumni Merit Award, St Louis University, 1981.
- The Jubilate Deo Award, the National Association of Pastoral Musicians, 2011.
- Unity Awards: Song of the Year for "Here, I Am, Lord," 2001.
- Favorite Hymn poll by readers of The Tablet for "I, the Lord of Sea and Sky" (also known as "Here I Am, Lord"), 2004.
- The Hearn Innovators in Christian Music, Baylor University School of Music, Guest-in-Residence 2018.

== Discography ==
=== St. Louis Jesuits Collaborations ===
1. Neither Silver nor Gold (1973) (St. Louis Jesuits collaboration)
2. Earthen Vessels (1975) (St. Louis Jesuits collaboration)
3. A Dwelling Place (1976) (St. Louis Jesuits collaboration)
4. Gentle Night (1977) (St. Louis Jesuits collaboration)
5. Lord of Light (1981) (St. Louis Jesuits collaboration)
6. The Steadfast Love (1985) (St. Louis Jesuits collaboration)
7. Let Heaven Rejoice (1997) (St. Louis Jesuits collaboration)
8. Lift Up Your Hearts (1996) (St. Louis Jesuits collaboration)
9. May We Praise You (1997) (St. Louis Jesuits collaboration)
10. Morning Light (2005) (St. Louis Jesuits collaboration)

=== Solo Collections ===
1. Lover of Us All (1989)
2. Drawn By A Dream (1993)
3. Always and Everywhere (1997)
4. Glory in the Cross (2001)
5. Prince of Peace: Music for Advent and Christmas (2004)
6. God's Holy Gifts (2008)
7. To Praise You (2012)
8. Mass of Christ the Savior/Misa Cristo Salvador - Expanded Edition (2013), Bilingual English/Spanish (2018)
9. Love and Grace - These Alone are Enough (2018)

=== Compilation Albums ===
1. Here I Am, Lord: Anthology 1970–1985 (2001)
2. You Are Near: Music For Quiet Reflection (2003)
3. All My Days: Instrumental Music for Quiet Reflection (2006)
4. One Lord of All (2007) St. Louis Jesuits Instrumental collection
5. Table of Plenty: Anthology 1985–2000 (2008)
6. Here I Am, Lord: 30th Anniversary Edition (2009)
7. Companion Music for Walking the Sacred Path (2009)
8. Age To Age – Generations of Faith (2012) (collaboration with Steve Angrisano and Curtis Stephan)
9. Coming Home: A Final Celebration (2019) (St. Louis Jesuits collaboration)

== See also ==
- St. Louis Jesuits
- Bernadette Farrell
- Marty Haugen
- Michael Joncas
