= Vida Reluz =

Brazilian band

- Origin: São José dos Campos, São Paulo, Brazil
- Genres: Contemporary Catholic liturgical music, soul, pop, rock
- Years active: 1985 – present
- Labels: Paulinas COMEP, DAVI CN
- Members: Cidinha Moraes (vocals); Felipe Souza (vocals); Rosana de Pádua (vocals); Mauricio Carvalho (keyboards); Cristiano Araújo (keyboards); Paulinho Oliveira (sax); Alexandre Saes (guitar)
- Past members: Elaine Cristina (vocals); Erik Rodrigues (drums); Luiz Palma (vocals and guitars); Marcelo Soares (low); C. Henrique (guitars); Gilbert (keyboards); Walmir Alencar (vocals); Marquinho (sax); Gerson Souza (guitar); R. Junior (drums); Everton Oliveira (low); Marcelo Berthoud (guitars); Emanuel Campos "Manu" (drums); Marcos Moreira (low); Luiz Felipe (vocals)
- Website: http://vidareluz.com/

Vida Reluz is a Brazilian band of popular Catholic music, originally from São José dos Campos. It was founded in 1985 by Walmir Alencar and Cidinha Moraes. The band has already released eight albums and two compilations, all on the Paulinas-COMEP label.

== History ==
In 1984 the band was formed as a Bible Group, and was part of the Society of Saint Vincent de Paul of the parish they attended in São José dos Campos, SP. After ten years of their career, they met Father Joãozinho, SCJ, already consecrated composer and singer of Paulinas Comep. He indicated them to the record company, Pauline Comep, and on August 15, 1995 they recorded the so-called "blue album", Vida Reluz, their first CD, released in 1996, earning a gold record, becoming a watershed, inaugurating a new was in popular Catholic music. It brought several hits, among them "Acreditar no Amor" and "Perfeito É Quem Te Criou".

After the first album, singer Elaine Cristina decides to pause her activities in the band. After two years, in 1997, the group released the album Celebra a Vitória, which was very critically acclaimed and had a great bandage, also gaining gold record and becoming a classic for the band. This album maintains the sound of the previous one and dares even more, with guitars and bass, drums grooves, keyboards and pianos optimally worked and the vocals that became trademark of the band, bringing hits like "Deus Quero Louvar-te," "Declaramos" and the title track "Celebra a Vitória", which has participation of Eugênio Jorge. This album is the Catholic Christian milieu and to this day is positively mentioned by connoisseurs of popular Catholic music.

After the release of Celebrate Vitoria, Elaine Cristina returns to the band's choir. At that time, on March 28, 1998, after a meeting, drummer and percussionist Erik Rodrigues, bassist Marcelo Soares, vocalist and guitarist Luiz Palma and keyboardist Gilbert Natalio decided to leave the band. The guitar player Carlos Henrique Ferreira still remains a week to help the band, but also decides to leave the group. Also the vocalist Walmir Alencar leaves of the musical group this year, to form Vida Reluz community, although remaining great contact with the group.

After the departure of most of the band, new members enter and the album Deus Imenso was released in 2000. This album was the first and only to win gold record in 2003 in the launching show of the CD Deus É Capaz. With the new training arose successes: "Diante do Rei", "Quem É Filho de Deus" and the title track "Deus Imenso". Still on the release of the album, drummer Ramiro Júnior, second bass player Everton Oliveira and saxophonist Marquinho also decided to leave the band, with Marquinho joining the already solo Gilberto and forming the pair Marquinho and Gilberto.

In 2002, Walmir Alencar definitively cuts the musical ties with the group leaving the name Vida Reluz in the hands of Cidinha Moraes, claiming that the Lord had a different mission for him. Also the singer Elaine Cristina decides this year to leave the band for being pregnant, without being able to follow the agenda of life glitters, and soon after she records her first solo album. In 2002 the guitarist Gerson Souza leaves the band, for living and studying music at USP in Ribeirão Preto, to follow the routine of shows was difficult, but contributed to the creation of various guitar solos of various successes of the band. Despite this, the group continues to record and in 2003 releases Deus É Capaz, which features the new singer Felipe Souza. Although the title track, "Deus É Capaz", received some airplay, the album did not go well in sales and ended up culminating in the definitive exit of Elaine Cristina from the band.

In an effort of reconstruction and union, in 2004 the group records Gratidão released in February 2005. Gratidão was better than the predecessor and launched successes like "Nome Maravilhoso" and "Gratidão" with the partiçipaçao of Ricardo Sá". On September 7, 2005, commemorating the band's twenty year career, they decided to record a show, whose CD and DVD recording resulted in the acclaimed live album Vida Reluz – Ao Vivo, sold on the Catholic market.

Recently, in 2009, the band moved to the record company of the Catholic community Canção Nova, DAVI, and released the album Toma o Teu Lugar, Senhor.

Back in Paulinas-COMEP, after a while without releasing records, the ministry launches the CD Restaurado pra Adorar, produced by the former member and friend Walmir Alencar.

On February 19, 2019, vocalist Luiz Felipe announced his departure from the band Vida Reluz, through his social networks, after being vocalist for 20 years.

== Discography ==
Year	Album	Sales	Certification
1996	Vida Reluz	100.000+	Gold
1997	Celebra a Vitória	100.000+	Gold
2000	Deus Imenso	100.000+	Gold
2003	Deus É Capaz	unknown	—
2005	Gratidão	unknown	—
2005	Vida Reluz - Ao Vivo	unknown	—
2009	Toma o Teu Lugar, Senhor	unknown	—
2012	Restaurado pra Adorar	unknown	—

=== Collecting ===
Year	Album	Sales	Certification
2008	Grandes Momentos	unknown	—
2011	Série Ouro	unknown	—

== Videography ==
- 1998 – Vida Reluz e Pe. Joãozinho (VHS)
- 2005 – Vida Reluz – Ao Vivo (DVD)

== Awards ==
Year	Container	Category	Result
2009	Grandes Momentos	I Louvemos o Senhor Trophy: Category: Best Collecting	Won
