= Marty Haugen =

American composer of liturgical music (born 1950)

Marty Haugen (born December 30, 1950) is an American composer of liturgical music.

== Biography ==
Marty Haugen was born December 30, 1950, in Wanamingo, Minnesota. He was raised in the American Lutheran Church (ALC) in Minnesota, and then became a member the United Church of Christ. His first job was as a worship leader in a Catholic parish in Minnesota in 1973. He began composing there in response to the poor quality of some of the music he was required to lead.

Haugen writes contemporary hymns and liturgical music for the Lutheran church. He holds a B.A. degree in psychology from Luther College and an M.A. degree in pastoral studies from the University of St. Thomas in St. Paul, Minnesota. He pursues a career as a liturgical composer and workshop presenter.

The majority of Haugen's compositions are published by GIA Publications. His works include two settings of the liturgy for Lutheran use, "Holden Evening Prayer" and "Now the Feast and Celebration", and settings of the Catholic Mass, including the Mass of Creation.

=== Works and songs ===
Haugen has also composed other works, including liturgical settings, choral arrangements, sacred songs, and hymns, including "Gather Us In", "Eye Has Not Seen", "We Are Many Parts", "We Remember", "Awake! Awake, and Greet the New Morn", and "Shepherd Me, O God", as well as psalm settings and paraphrases.

Haugen is a performing musician, and has recorded a number of CDs.

== Lutheran liturgical music ==
Haugen has written liturgical settings for the Evangelical Lutheran Church in America (ELCA), including Now the Feast and Celebration, (written in collaboration with three campus pastors at Pacific Lutheran University, Susan Briehl, Dan Erlander, and Martin Wells), Unfailing Light, an evening communion service (written in collaboration with Pastor Susan Briehl), Holy Communion Setting Two for Evangelical Lutheran Worship, and an evening prayer setting, Holden Evening Prayer, originally written for Holden Village.

These settings have been published in various forms, with some of them appearing in the ELCA hymnal supplement With One Voice and the newest hymnal, Evangelical Lutheran Worship (2006).

== Selected discography ==
- We Come Dancing (1999) (with Donna Peña, Gary Daigle, and Bobby Fischer)
- In The Days To Come-Songs Of Peace (2007)
- That You May Have Life (2005)
- The Feast Of Life (2000)

=== Appears on ===
- Liam Lawton, Clouds' Veil

== See also ==
- Contemporary Catholic music
- St. Louis Jesuits
- Dan Schutte
