= Suscipe =

Latin word for 'receive'

Ignatius offers his sword to an image of Our Lady of Montserrat.

Suscipe (Latin pronunciation: [suʃˈʃiːpe]) is the Latin word for 'receive'. While the term was popularized by St. Ignatius of Loyola, founder of the Society of Jesus, who incorporated it into his Spiritual Exercises in the early sixteenth century, it goes back to monastic profession, in reciting Psalm 119. This article focuses rather on its popularization through the Exercises and through the Roman Missal, where it introduces the Canon of the Mass.

== In the Mass ==
The Suscipe prayer concludes the Preparation of the Gifts in the Mass, in anticipation of the transubstantiation to occur in the Eucharistic Prayer. This prayer, translated in the 2010 Missal as “May the Lord accept,” first appeared in Charles the Bald’s (875-877) prayer book. This follows the priest's words, the Orate fratres: “Pray, brethren (brothers and sisters), that my sacrifice and yours may be acceptable to God, the almighty Father.”

The Latin ‘suscipio’ is used instead of ‘accipio’ or ‘recipio,’ which in English means ‘receive.’ This is because ‘suscipe’ includes the idea of both receiving and taking up. Christ offered Himself to the Father on the cross and His offering was not only received by the Father, but was also ‘taken up’ by the Father, as indicated by Christ's Resurrection.

== Ignatian Suscipe ==
=== Context ===
Ignatius wrote that ‘spiritual exercises’ is the name given to every way of preparing and disposing one's soul to rid oneself of all disordered attachments, so that once rid of them one might seek and find the divine will in regard to the disposition of one's life. The Exercises are a set of meditations and contemplations of the life of Christ to be carried out over a four-week time period, most appropriately on a secluded retreat.

The Suscipe is not found in any of the four weeks of the Spiritual Exercises, but rather was included by Ignatius as additional material in regards to the “contemplation for attaining love” at the end of the Exercises. In this section, Ignatius speaks of the immeasurable love of God that is bestowed upon all of creation, and then asks what he might offer to such a loving God:

(234) First Point

This is to recall to mind the blessings of creation and redemption, and the special favors I have received.

I will ponder with great affection how much God our Lord has done for me, and how much He has given me of what He possesses, and finally, how much, as far as He can, the same Lord desires to give Himself to me according to His divine decrees.

Then I will reflect upon myself, and consider, according to all reason and justice, what I ought to offer the Divine Majesty, that is, all I possess and myself with it. Thus, as one would do who is moved by great feeling, I will make this offering of myself:

Take, Lord, and Receive

Take, Lord, and receive all my liberty, my memory, my understanding, and my entire will, all that I have and possess. Thou hast given all to me. To Thee, O Lord, I return it. All is Thine, dispose of it wholly according to Thy will. Give me Thy love and Thy grace, for this is sufficient for me.

=== Text ===
==== Latin ====
Suscipe, Domine, universam meam libertatem. Accipe memoriam, intellectum, atque voluntatem omnem. Quidquid habeo vel possideo mihi largitus es; id Tibi totum restituo, ac Tuae prorsus voluntati trado gubernandum. Amorem Tui solum cum gratia Tua mihi dones, et dives sum satis, nec aliud quidquam ultra posco. Amen.

==== English ====
Literal translation: "Receive, O Lord, all my liberty. Take my memory, understanding and entire will. Whatever I have or possess, You have given me; I restore it all to You, and surrender it wholly to be governed by Your will. Give me love, for You alone along with your grace, and I am rich enough, and ask for nothing more".

==== Chinese (traditional script) ====
'奉獻身心

吾主天主，納我自由， 能力意志，懇請受收； 我身我靈，承恩隆厚， 報本思源，虔心奉求。

盡我所有，由汝支配， 聖意唯從，力行不悖； 期望我主，寵愛榮惠， 我心永潔，更無稀匱。'

==== Spanish ====
Tomad, Señor, y recibid, toda mi libertad, mi memoria, mi entendimiento y toda mi voluntad. Todo mi haber y mi poseer. Vos me lo diste, a vos, Señor, lo torno. Todo es vuestro. Disponed de todo a vuestra voluntad. Dadme vuestro amor y gracia que ésta me basta. Amén.

== Act of Resignation ==
The Venerable Mother Catherine McAuley, an Irish nun who founded the Sisters of Mercy in 1831, is also credited with a 'suscipe' prayer. Also known as the “Act of Resignation”, the prayer is one of many that she wrote and is perhaps her best known.

My God, I am yours for time and eternity. Teach me to cast myself entirely into the arms of your loving Providence with a lively, unlimited confidence in your compassionate, tender pity. Grant, O most merciful Redeemer, that whatever you ordain or permit may be acceptable to me. Take from my heart all painful anxiety; let nothing sadden me but sin, nothing delight me but the hope of coming to the possession of You my God and my all, in your everlasting kingdom. Amen.

== Musical settings ==
A version by composer John Foley, SJ, was included in the Earthen Vessels collection in 1974, reissued in 2014.

American liturgical music composer Dan Schutte wrote a setting in 2004, “These Alone Are Enough”, now published by OCP Publications. It has since been translated into Spanish (Sólo Eso Me Basta) and Vietnamese (Dâng và Xin), and these are found in Catholic hymnals and hand missals across the United States.

A setting of the Ignatian Suscipe by the British composer Howard Goodall was first performed at Glasgow Royal Concert Hall in November 2009. The choir, orchestra, and gamelan of St Aloysius' College, Glasgow were conducted by Liam Devlin, to whom the work is dedicated, and it was part of the Jesuit college's 150th anniversary celebrations.

In the Philippines, the local Jesuit Music Ministry has produced a number of popular Tagalog versions, and these are often default Offertory hymns. These include several each Manoling V. Francisco, SJ, Eduardo Hontiveros, SJ, and Fruto Ll. Ramírez, SJ.

In Indonesia, a version commonly sung at Mass is Ambillah, Tuhan, an Indonesian translation of a setting by the Belgian Louis Lambillotte, SJ, listed in the hymnal Puji Syukur (#382). Another one is Ambillah dan Terimalah by the Indonesian composer, Onggo Lukito.

== Further references ==
- Joseph A. Munitiz and Philip Endean, Saint Ignatius of Loyola Personal Writings. New York: Penguin Books, 2004.
- Creighton University: Collaborative Ministry.
- St. Ignatius Selected Prayers.
- Herbermann, Charles, ed. (1913). "Offertory" . Catholic Encyclopedia. New York: Robert Appleton Company.
- Journeysongs: Third Edition Hymnal, Breaking Bread, "These Alone Are Enough"
- Sisters of Mercy of the Americas: Catherine McAuley.
- Fr. Paul Hinnebusch, OP, STM. Meaning of Suscipe Fiat (PDF).
