= Graham Clark =

Graham Clark may refer to:

- Graham Clark (English cricketer) (born 1993), English cricketer
- Graham Clark (Emmerdale), fictional character from British soap opera Emmerdale
- Graham Clark (EastEnders), fictional character from the British soap opera EastEnders
- Graham Clark (tenor) (1941–2023), English tenor
- Graham Clark (violinist) (born 1959), British jazz violinist
- Graham Clark (footballer) (born 1961), Scottish footballer with Darlington and Montrose
- Graham Clark (comedian), Canadian comedian

== See also ==
- Grahame Clark (1907–1995), British archaeologist
- M. Graham Clark, American educator

== See also ==
- Graham Clarke (disambiguation)
- Graeme Clark (disambiguation)
