= Musicae Sacrae =

1955 papal encyclical by Pius XII

Musicae Sacrae Latin for 'On Sacred Music' Encyclical of Pope Pope Pius XII
- Signature date: 25 December 1955
- Subject: Liturgical music
- Text: In Latin; In English

Musicae Sacrae (On Sacred Music) is a 1955 encyclical by Pope Pius XII dealing with Catholic liturgical music. It updated the 1903 motu proprio Inter pastoralis officii sollicitudines, and was furtherly amended by the instruction Musicam sacram in 1967.

The encyclical continued in the tradition of Inter pastoralis officii sollicitudines of keeping a rather conservative attitude toward music used in worship.

However, the encyclical did soften some of the previous restrictions. It allowed the singing of vernacular hymns at certain places in the mass, formalizing existing practice in places such as Germany.
