= WLP =

The initials WLP may stand for several things, such as the following:

- Wafer-level packaging, a type of integrated circuit (microchip) packaging
- Weakest liberal precondition, a computer programming concept
- WebSphere Liberty Profile, a computer software version
- Windows Logo Program, a Microsoft Windows branding and certification program
- Women's Learning Partnership for Rights, Development, and Peace, an international non-profit, non-governmental organization that is dedicated to women's leadership and empowerment.
- Wood–Ljungdahl pathway, set of biochemical reactions used by some bacteria, also known as the reductive acetyl-coenzyme A (acetyl-CoA) pathway.
- Wikileaks Party, an Australian political party
- World Library Publications, A former major publisher of Catholic liturgical music in the United States, now a division of GIA Publications
