= Yolanda Pupo-Ortiz =

American Methodist minister (born 1937)

Yolanda E. Pupo-Ortiz (born 1937) is an American Methodist minister. She was the first Hispanic or Latina woman to be fully received into the Southern New England Conference of the United Methodist Church when she joined its ranks in 1983.

Of partial Puerto Rican descent, Pupo-Ortiz was born into a family of Quakers, and was raised in Cuba; she converted to Methodism at the time of her marriage. She took degrees from Colegio Los Amigos and Seminario Evangélico de Teología, both in Cuba, and holds a master's degree from Emory University. During her career she has worked as a pastor and has served as associate general secretary of the United Methodist Church's Religion and Race Commission, and directed programs for Spanish-speaking students at Garrett-Evangelical Theological Seminary. She serves currently serves as a member of the clergy at Epworth United Methodist Church in Gaithersburg, Maryland. Her translation of the hymn "Here I Am, Lord" has been published.
