= Oregon Catholic Press =

American publisher of Catholic liturgical music

- Founded: 1922
- Founder: Archbishop Alexander Christie
- Country of origin: United States
- Headquarters location: Portland, Oregon
- Publication types: Music, books, newspapers
- Imprints: OCP, New Dawn Music, Spirit & Song, Trinitas, Catholic Sentinel, and El Centinela
- No. of employees: 150+
- Official website: www.ocp.org

Oregon Catholic Press, also known as OCP (originally the Catholic Truth Society of Oregon) is a publisher of Catholic liturgical music based in Portland, Oregon. It published the newspapers Catholic Sentinel and El Centinela; both papers have been discontinued effective October 1, 2022.

== Operations ==
The not-for-profit company publishes liturgical music, books, choral collections, hymnals, missals, and support materials serving the Roman Catholic Church in English, Spanish, Vietnamese, Korean and Chinese.

OCP also publishes contemporary Christian music, through its Spirit and Song imprint. All music is consistent with the ethical directives and theology of the Catholic Church, making Spirit & Song a suitable alternative to mainstream praise and worship music for Catholic parishes.

Pastoral Press, a division of OCP, publishes religious education materials and academic and inspirational books.

OCP is the long-term publisher of the Catholic Sentinel, the diocesan newspaper for the Archdiocese of Portland. The Sentinel is the longest running Catholic newspaper in the Western United States. On July 21, 2022, the Archdiocese of Portland and Oregon Catholic Press issued a joint news release announcing that both the Catholic Sentinel and El Centinela (the Sentinel's Spanish language edition) would close on Oct. 1.

OCP represents well-known contemporary Catholic liturgical music composers Dan Schutte, and the other members known as the St. Louis Jesuits (Bob Dufford, John Foley, Tim Manion and Roc O'Connor), Bernadette Farrell, Carey Landry, Michael Joncas, Jamie Cortez, Bob Hurd, Tom Kendzia, Anne Quigley, and Christopher Walker. More contemporary songwriters, such as Steve Angrisano, Casey McKinley and Sarah Hart are represented by the Spirit and Song imprint.

Along with GIA Publications, OCP is a co-owner of OneLicense.net, having merged LicenSingOnline.org with OneLicense.net on January 1, 2017.

== History ==
OCP was first founded in 1922 as the Catholic Truth Society of Oregon by Archbishop Alexander Christie. Its mission was to combat the Ku Klux Klan by providing information about the Catholic Church to all peoples. In 1934, OCP published its first Missal called My Sunday Missal (Now known as Today's Missal). The Missal was a major success for OCP, becoming popular in the United States. It would not be until 1982 that OCP would publish Breaking Bread, its first annual missal with weekly readings. After Breaking Bread was published OCP would continue to publish worship resources such as, Flor y Canto, Glory & Praise, Breaking Bread etc. As of 2026, OCP has more than 20,000 music copyrights and 3,000 octavos and continues to expand its repertoire to this day.

== Publications ==
Missals

- Breaking Bread, an annual missal, available with or without weekly readings.
- Today's Missal, a seasonal missal printed 3 times a year.
- Heritage Missal, an annual missal, with a repertoire leaning towards traditional hymns, Latin & chant.
- Misal de Dia, the Spanish-language equivalent to the English seasonal missal Today's Missal.
- Choose Christ Missal, discontinued after the 2024 edition.
- Unidos en Cristo, a bilingual (Spanish & English) missal, with music and readings in both languages.

Hymnals

- Glory and Praise, hymnal first published by North American Liturgy Resources in the 70's and 80's with Vatican II renewal. OCP purchased North American Liturgical Resources in 1987 and integrated Glory & Praise into its product lineup. In 2015, OCP published Glory and Praise Third Edition.
- JourneySongs, a hymnal consisting of traditional Catholic music and popular contemporary songs from Music Issue and Spirit & Song.
- Spirit & Song, music for youth and teens, as well as emerging Praise and Worship style songs.
- Rise Up & Sing, Scripture-based, liturgical hymnal for young children.
- Never Too Young, Contemporary songs for middle schoolers for prayer, liturgy and the classroom.
- Flor y Canto, a bilingual hymnal for churches that worship in both English and Spanish.
- Thánh Ca Dân Chúa, in Vietnamese.

OCP also publishes Respond & Acclaim, a yearly subscription-based psalm resource, which includes a responsorial psalm and a gospel acclamation for every Sunday and Holy Day. The music for the Respond & Acclaim psalms was written by former publisher Owen Alstott.

== Leadership ==
- Bp. Alexander Sample, as Archbishop of Portland from 2013 to present, chairman of the board of directors.
- Wade Wisler, publisher, since April 2016.
- John Limb, publisher emeritus, continues to support the mission and strategic plans for OCP.
- Owen Alstott, former publisher and member of the board of directors.

== See also ==
- Contemporary Catholic liturgical music
