= Graham Clarke =

Graham Clarke may refer to:

- Graham Clarke (Australian cricketer) (1939–2006), Australian cricketer
- Graham Clarke (musician) (born 1970), American singer, songwriter and guitarist
- Graham Clarke (footballer) (1935–2010), English footballer with Southampton F.C.
- Graham Clarke (hurler) (born 1974), Irish hurler with Down
