= Péloquin =

Péloquin or Peloquin is a surname. Notable people with the surname include:

- Adam Peloquin (born 1990), American football coach
- Alexander Peloquin, American liturgical music composer
- Bruce Peloquin (1939–2024), American politician
- Claude Péloquin (1942–2018), Canadian poet and director
- Corey Peloquin (born 1968), Canadian wrestler
- François Péloquin, Canadian film director
- Fred Peloquin, Canadian wrestler
- Gaston Péloquin (1939–1994), Canadian politician
- Jean-Guy Péloquin (fl. 1981–1993), Canadian also-ran
- Jerry Peloquin (fl. 1965–1974), American drummer, member of the band Jerry Airplane
- Leo Peloquin (fl. 1989–1998), former mayor of Hartney, Manitoba, Canada
- Madeleine Péloquin, Canadian actress
- Robert D. Peloquin, American lawyer and private intelligence director
