= John Foley (Jesuit) =

American Jesuit priest and songwriter

John Foley SJ (born 1939) is an American Jesuit priest who is a composer of Catholic liturgical music and a professor of liturgy. Among his compositions are "One Bread, One Body" (1978), "Earthen Vessels" (1975), "Come to the Water" (1978), "The Cry of the Poor" (1978), "For You Are My God" (1970), and the album As a River of Light (1989).

Much of Foley's early work on liturgical music was as a member of the St. Louis Jesuits, composed of fellow Jesuit seminarians with whom he released several albums. He also released several solo collections of liturgical music. Both the solo and the group efforts were released through publishers North American Liturgy Resources (NALR), OCP, and GIA Publications.

Foley earned a doctorate in liturgical theology from the Graduate Theological Union in Berkeley, California. In 1993 he returned to Saint Louis University where he founded the Stroble Center for Liturgy. The center has since closed with Foley's retirement.

== See also ==
- St. Louis Jesuits
- Dan Schutte
