= Catholic Sentinel =

Newspaper in Portland, Oregon

- Type: Twice-monthly newspaper
- Owner: Oregon Catholic Press
- Founder(s): Henry Herman and J. F. Atkinson
- Founded: 1869; 157 years ago
- Ceased publication: October 1, 2022
- Language: English
- City: Portland, Oregon
- Country: United States
- Sister newspapers: El Centinela
- Website: catholicsentinel.org

The Catholic Sentinel was the newspaper of the Archdiocese of Portland. It was published by Oregon Catholic Press, which also published El Centinela, the Spanish-language version of the Catholic Sentinel. The Catholic Sentinel published an online edition from 1996 to 2022. In 2022, it was announced that both the Sentinel and El Centinela would be discontinued as of October 1, 2022.

== History ==
The Catholic Sentinel was started in 1869 by grocer Henry Herman and printer J. F. Atkinson in response to anti-Catholicism. After the Whitman massacre in 1847, a Protestant minister falsely accused local Catholics of inciting a band of Cayuse Indians to killing 10 Protestant missionaries.

The Sentinel states it has consistently fought anti-Catholic prejudice. In 1879, editor Stephen McCormick stated:

The need of a vigorous defender of the Faith in the Northwest is apparent to every Catholic who notices the numerous calumnies and slanders the Sentinel is called on to refute in the course of a single year. We have to defend the truth against all attacks; to explain honest misconstructions; to correct willful misrepresentations; expose false assertions, refute sophistical arguments, and above all to advocate effectively, correctly and positively the Faith that is in us and which is the bond of Christian unity that unites us to our readers.

In August 1895, Rev. Roland Grant of the American Protective Association spoke at the First Baptist Church in Portland. Among other claims, members of the A.P.A. maintained that the hierarchy of the Roman Catholic Church had instigated the Civil War, during which they said Catholics made up large numbers of deserters, and that both Grover Cleveland and William McKinley were controlled by the Church. The Sentinel covered Grant's speech, in which he spoke highly of an A.P.A riot in Boston a month earlier on the 4th of July.

In 1913, the editor of the Silverton Journal, J. E. Hosmer, published a pamphlet entitled, "The Escaped Nun from Mount Angel Convent or The Last Stand of Desperate Despotism". Hosmer was later convicted of libel and recanted. In 1912, and for several years thereafter, the Ku Klux Klan circulated a bogus oath supposedly taken by members of the Knights of Columbus. The spurious pledge contained, among other provisions, those in which members purported pledged loyalty to the Pope and denounced Liberals, Masons, and Protestants; pledged not to hire any Protestant, and to send domestic workers as spies into Protestant homes.

In 1928, the Catholic Sentinel was acquired by the Catholic Truth Society of Oregon, later renamed Oregon Catholic Press. It moved to a new printing plant in 1963 after its former building was condemned as part of the Stadium Freeway project.

In 2017, the Catholic Press Association of the United States named the Sentinel Newspaper of the Year in its category. The last time the paper had won that honor was in 1959. It won it again in 2021.

On July 21, 2022, the Archdiocese of Portland and Oregon Catholic Press issued a joint news release announcing that both the Catholic Sentinel and El Centinela (its Spanish-language counterpart) would close on October 1.
