= Adoration and Life Ministry =

Catholic music group from Brazil

- Origin: São José dos Campos, São Paulo, Brazil
- Genre: Contemporary Catholic liturgical music
- Years active: 2005 - present
- Label: Paulinas COMEP
- Members: Walmir Alencar; Rodrigo Pires; Bruno Rocha; Cayan Vieira
- Past members: Fátima Souza

Adoration and Life Ministry is a Catholic music group from Brazil, founded in São José dos Campos in 2005, by the musician Walmir Alencar. Adoration and Life is among the most well-known Catholic groups of the country. According to the ministry's own website, its mission is "to turn the stage into an altar, where the love of God is experienced by every human being who wishes to have a personal encounter with the Lord." Among its most famous songs are: "Abraço de Pai", "Gratidão" and "Hoje Livre Sou", "Deus Imenso " and "Em Teu Altar."

In 2012, singer Fátima Souza left the group because she was pregnant, continued with a solo career.

== Members ==
Current members
Name	Function	Period in activity
Walmir Alencar	Vocalist	2005–present
Bruno Rocha	Guitarist; Backing vocal Composer	2005-present
Renatinho Santos	Backing vocal	2020-present
Brendo Katagi	Guitarist	2020-present
Juninho Nunes	Drummer	2021-present
Former members
Fátima Souza	Vocalist	2005-2012
Rodrigo Pires	Keyboardist; Backing vocal Composer	2005-2020
Cayan Vieira	Drummer	2005-2018

== Discography ==
Albums
Name	Release year	Number of tracks
O Céu Se Abre	2006	11
Hoje Livre Sou		17
Em Santidade	2011	12
Herói	2013	13
Shekinah	2016	14

In addition to these, the ministry has also released the EP "Mais do Que Vencedor", which features 5 songs, and the single "Que Entre o Rei".
