= Flor y Canto =

Flor y Canto (first edition) is a hymnal published by Oregon Catholic Press in 1989. The book is typically used in the Hispanic Catholic community for worship and liturgies in churches throughout the year. The book has over 700 songs. Recordings were made by the group Flor y Canto in the church of St. Michael Catholic Church, in Cary, North Carolina.

Flor y Canto Segunda Edición is a hymnal which includes 737 hymns and songs in Spanish in a variety of styles, representing music from the Americas, Mexico, Spain, Guatemala, Nicaragua, and Puerto Rico. 'Flor y Canto' is Spanish for 'flower and song'. Flor y Canto Segunda Edición was compiled by Rodolfo López. The second edition was published in 2001, the third in 2011, and the fourth in 2023.

== Partial list of composers ==
Antonio Alcalde, Eleazar Cortés, Jaime Cortez, Carmelo Erdozáin, Juan Espinosa, Cesáreo Gabaráin, Bob Hurd, Miguel Manzano, Emilio Vicente Matéu, Alejandro Mejía, Br. Alfredo Morales, FSC, Mary Frances Reza, Carlos Rosas, Juan J. Sosa, Alberto Taulé, Aldo Blanco, José Luis Castillo, Roger Hernández, Dolores Martínez, Mauricio Centeno, Lourdes Montgomery, Tony Rubi, Rogelio Zelada, Padre Zezinho, SCJ, . . . and many others
