= Graeme Clark =

Graeme Clark may refer to:

- Graeme C. Clark, Canadian ambassador
- Graeme Clark (doctor) (born 1935), pioneer of cochlear implants
- Graeme Clark (musician) (born 1965), Scottish musician
- Graeme Clarke, Canadian ice hockey player

== See also ==
- Graham Clark (disambiguation)
