= Ray Repp =

American singer-songwriter (1942–2020)

Raymond Robert Repp (September 17, 1942 – April 26, 2020) was an American singer-songwriter credited with introducing folk music into Catholic Masses with his album Mass for Young Americans (1965), an album that formed the earliest stirrings of Contemporary Christian music.

== Biography ==
=== Early life and education ===
Repp was born in St. Louis, Missouri, to Walter and Rita Kempf Repp, the eldest of their nine children. He was educated in Catholic schools: Seven Holy Founders Elementary School, St. Louis Preparatory Seminary, Cardinal Glennon College, and Kenrick Seminary, with graduate studies at St. Paul's Seminary, Ottawa, Canada. Later he studied music and languages in Vienna, Austria.

=== Career ===
After his 1965 album, Repp recorded 11 collections which have been translated into 28 languages, and won ASCAP's "Award for Special Contributions to the Field of Music" six times. His song collections include The Best of Ray Repp Vol. 1 & 2 and Yesterday, Today & Tomorrow, with all songs written from 1965 to 1985. Repp's music has been recorded by those outside the Catholic Church. Christian punk outfit Undercover and Christian rocker Phil Keaggy have both covered Repp's work on their own discs.

Repp also recorded non-religious material. "Don't Go In the Street" and "Apple Pie", both from The Time Has Not Come True, featured sometimes humorous, prescient left-leaning social commentary.

In 1997, Repp drew a measure of notoriety from the mainstream journalistic media when he sued composer Andrew Lloyd Webber, asserting that Lloyd Webber had plagiarized portions of his "The Phantom of the Opera" from his own composition "Till You". Lloyd Webber, however, cross-litigated with a counter-accusation that Repp had, in fact, plagiarized portions of "Till You" from "Close Every Door", from Joseph and the Amazing Technicolor Dreamcoat. Repp ultimately lost the case.

=== Death ===
On April 26, 2020, Repp died after battling both lymphoma and metastatic melanoma, the latter of which of those two forms of cancer was the direct cause of his death.

== Theology ==
Repp as one of the first artists to employ the idiom of popular 1960's folk music within Catholic liturgical music. While clearly not neglecting vertical theology in his compositions, Repp was a major proponent of horizontal theology (i.e., emphasis on social justice themes and 'love of neighbor') in Christian music. In a tribute to Repp by David Haas, another Catholic singer-songwriter, Repp is quoted as having said:

"Latin philosophy and theology textbooks could hardly hold my attention from the books of my new heroes: Deikmann, Davis, Jungman. I was writing music at the same time, usually secretly in my small seminary room. But liturgical music? The thought never crossed my mind. If my music hadn't been officially banned in dozens of U.S. dioceses, it probably would never have caught on. My songs were written out of my frustrations then at seeing little concern for the neglected Hispanics and Blacks in Utah, not only by Mormons but my own affluent Catholics. [...] If our music is to praise God, it can only do so by helping to change us and our communities into more sensitive, loving, and just human beings."

Perhaps the best summary of Repp's theology can be found in Song of Micah in his work Ever Bless (1985). This song is based on Micah 6:3–8:

This is all I ask of you, this is the only praise I seek: That your love be gentle and your lives be just, and humbly walk along with me.

Should we go before the Lord, bowing low, and giving praise? Will the Lord be pleased with gifts we have to bring, with songs we want to sing?
Should we make some sacrifice? Should we offer up our lives to the Lord on high? How shall we adore the Lord forevermore?
My people hear me, what have I done – that you distrust so my gift of love? What will the Lord be satisfied by our gifts and songs of praise? Will the Lord be pleased, what honor can we give? Should we change the way we live?

== Personal life ==
Repp was married to, and lived with, his husband of twenty years, Richard Alther, who made his own living as a writer and painter, in their homes in Southern California and Vermont. Alther wrote The Decade of Blind Dates about his past relationships as a homosexual divorcee and his marriage to Repp.

== Works ==
=== Writing ===
In 2018, Repp published his first book, TABLE TALES: Do Ahead Dinner Party Menus That Whet Appetites, Loosen Tongues, and Make Memories.

=== Selected discography ===
Data from One Way Jesus Music (music from the Jesus Movement) website:

- 1965, Mass for Young Americans, F.E.L.
- 1966, Allelu!, F.E.L.
- 1967, Come Alive, F.E.L.
- 1968, Sing Praise, F.E.L.
- 1969, The Time Has Not Come True, F.E.L. (recorded 1966)
- 1972, Hear the Cryin' , Myrrh
- 1974, Give Us Peace, K&R (also released in 1975 on Agape label)
- 1978, Benedicamus – The Song of the Earth, K&R
- 1979, Sunrise, in the Dead of Winter, K&R
- 1981, By Love Are We All Bound, K&R
- 1985, Ever Bless, K&R

Data from the OCP Publications website:

- circa 2005, The Best of Ray Repp Vol. I, OCP (a compilation of some of his works 1965–1972)
- circa 2005, The Best of Ray Repp Vol. II, OCP (a compilation of some of his works 1974–1981)

Data from the Amazon website:

- circa 2005, Yesterday, Today & Tomorrow, OCP (a re-titled re-release of the 1985 collection, Ever Bless)
