= Women composers of Catholic music =

Since the Middle Ages, women (including Hildegard of Bingen and Vittoria Aleotti) have been composing music for the Catholic Church.

American, Australian, Filipino and English Catholic hymn collections dating from the first half of the 20th century include hymns and service music by religious women living in convents. Authorship of their compositions was identified only by the composer's first name, initials, or the city where their convent was located.

Some of the women who compose music for the Church are Carol Browning, Jeanne Cotter, Dolores Dufner, Barbara Bridge, Bernadette Farrell, Dolores Hruby, Donna Peña, Anne Quigley, M.D. Ridge, Gigi de Jesus, Suzanne Toolan, Lori True, Sarah Hart and Janèt Sullivan Whitaker.
