= Ultrasonic Studios, New Orleans =

Recording studio in New Orleans, Louisiana, United States

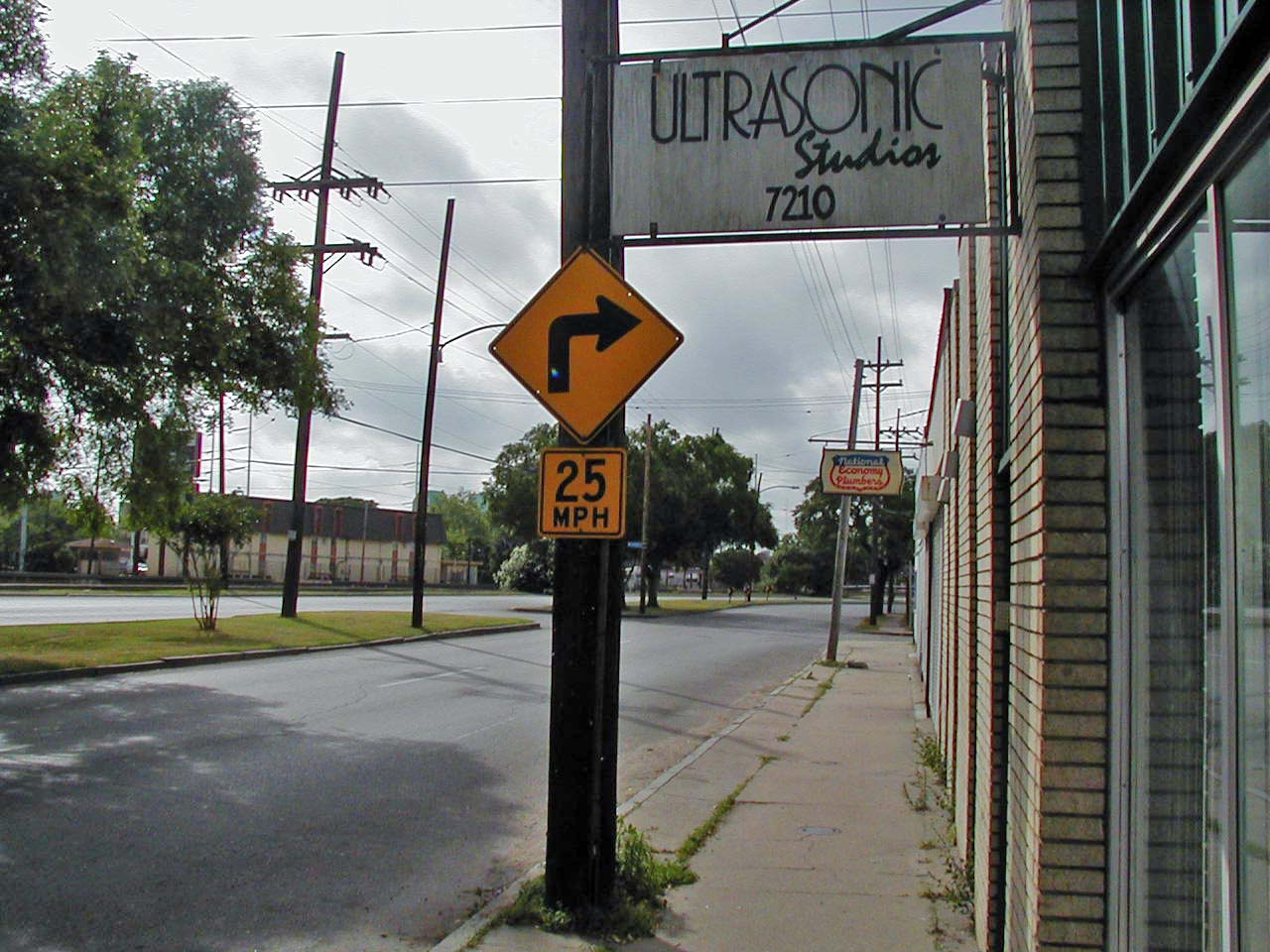
Ultrasonic Studios on Washington Avenue in 2004.

Ultrasonic Studios was a music recording studio in New Orleans, Louisiana, United States. The studio was located on Washington Avenue in the Uptown neighborhood near Xavier University. It was established in 1977 by Jay Gallager and George Hallowell. The studio was sold to the two Grammy Engineers, David Farrell and Steve Reynolds, who ran the day-to-day operations. They co-owned the studio. In 2005, the studio suffered major damage from the levee failure disaster flood during Hurricane Katrina, and has not been back in operation since. According to Jay Gallager in a 2007 interview, the building has knocked down following the hurricane. There are no plans to rebuild the building or restore the studio elsewhere. Farrell and Reynolds have moved on to other career paths.

The studio has been the recording scene of thousands of noteworthy International and New Orleans & Louisiana music projects including Corey Harris' Fish Ain't Bitin', Dr. John's Goin' Back To New Orleans, James Booker's Classified, Clarence "Gatemouth" Brown's Gate Swings, Fats Domino's Alive and Kickin' and The Dirty Dozen Brass Band's Jelly. Catholic recording artists The Dameans recorded their 1986 album "Light in the Darkness" at Ultrasonic Studios.
