= Graham Clarke (musician) =

American musician

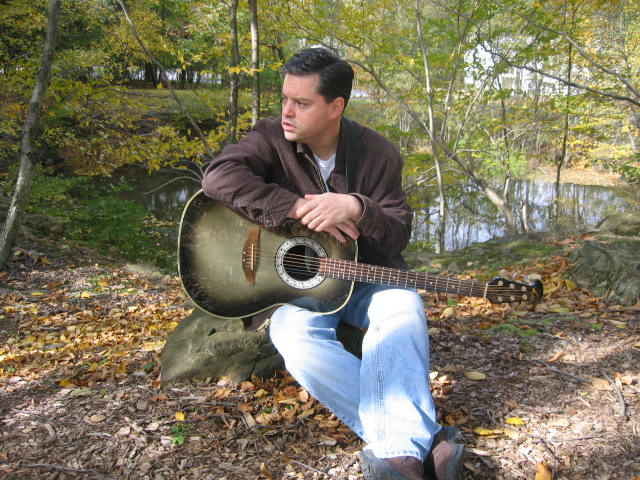
- Graham Clarke in 2005 (holding Delores, one of his guitars)

Background information
- Also known as: Graham the Music Man; The Gruse
- Born: Graham Peter Clarke; July 11, 1970 (age 56); Teaneck, New Jersey
- Genres: Children's music, Acoustic music, popular music, rock, traditional music
- Instruments: Vocals, guitar
- Years active: 1995–present
- Website: www.GrahamClarke.com

Graham Peter Clarke (/ˈɡræm ˈklɑːrk/; born July 11, 1970) is an American musician, songwriter, arranger, and entertainer. Active since 1995 and performing in the New York metropolitan area, Clarke has played well over 5,000 musical performances on the East Coast for children and adults. His style has been described as funny and "off-center". He self-publishes his music.

== Early life ==
Graham Clarke was born in Holy Name Medical Center in Teaneck, New Jersey on July 11, 1970. Clarke's parents, Lorain Maria Clarke (née Meola), a homemaker, and Thomas Michael "Moose" Clarke, a stockbroker were married in 1960 and had three children before Graham: Thomas in 1961, Dennis in 1962, and Martin in 1965. He spent the first seven years of his life in a split-level home in Dumont, New Jersey. He was frequently in the room when his older brother Tommy would have guitar lessons with musician Bob Berger. Bob noted one time when a screaming Graham had scarlet fever "That boy's screaming on key! That's a C note." Such exposure to music had an obvious influence on him and there is an oft-told family story that claims the first song Graham ever learned to sing was "Me and Julio Down by the Schoolyard," a popular song Tommy was learning on the guitar at the time. At the age of seven, his family moved one town over to Oradell, where he attended St. Joseph Grammar School, and later Bergen Catholic High School. Neither school had a music program so Graham taught himself how to play the guitar using his brother's old fake books.

== Career ==
=== 1989 to 1996: Burgeoning musician ===
Attending Boston College in the fall of 1988, Clarke accepted an invitation into the school's undergraduate Honors Program. In addition to performing at bars, clubs and street performances at subway stations, he acted at the Robsham Theater and wrote sketch comedy for the campus coffeehouse. He also traveled with conductor Alexander Peloquin and the Boston College Chorale, singing as a bass, baritone, and tenor. In 1991 Graham met his future wife, Peggy Clarke (née Amlung), who was a graduate student in the BC theology department.

After graduation in 1992, Clarke moved to New Rochelle in the affluent Westchester suburbs of New York City. In September he took a job working as an English teacher at Evander Childs High School in the Bronx. In 1994, he left teaching and entered the philosophy PhD program at Fordham University. In an effort to help his sister-in-law, Janine, in 1995 Clarke began caring part-time for Janine's son, Blake. Noticing how much Blake enjoyed it when he brought over his guitar, Janine, herself a teacher, suggested that he go to the local nursery schools daycare centers to see if they needed a music specialist. She gave him some Raffi cassettes and other children's music she used in the classroom. By the end of 1996, Clarke was making weekly visits to over 20 schools and daycare centers and parties throughout Westchester and Rockland Counties. From 1999 onward, he worked as a children's party entertainment in Westchester.

=== 1997 to present: recording artist ===
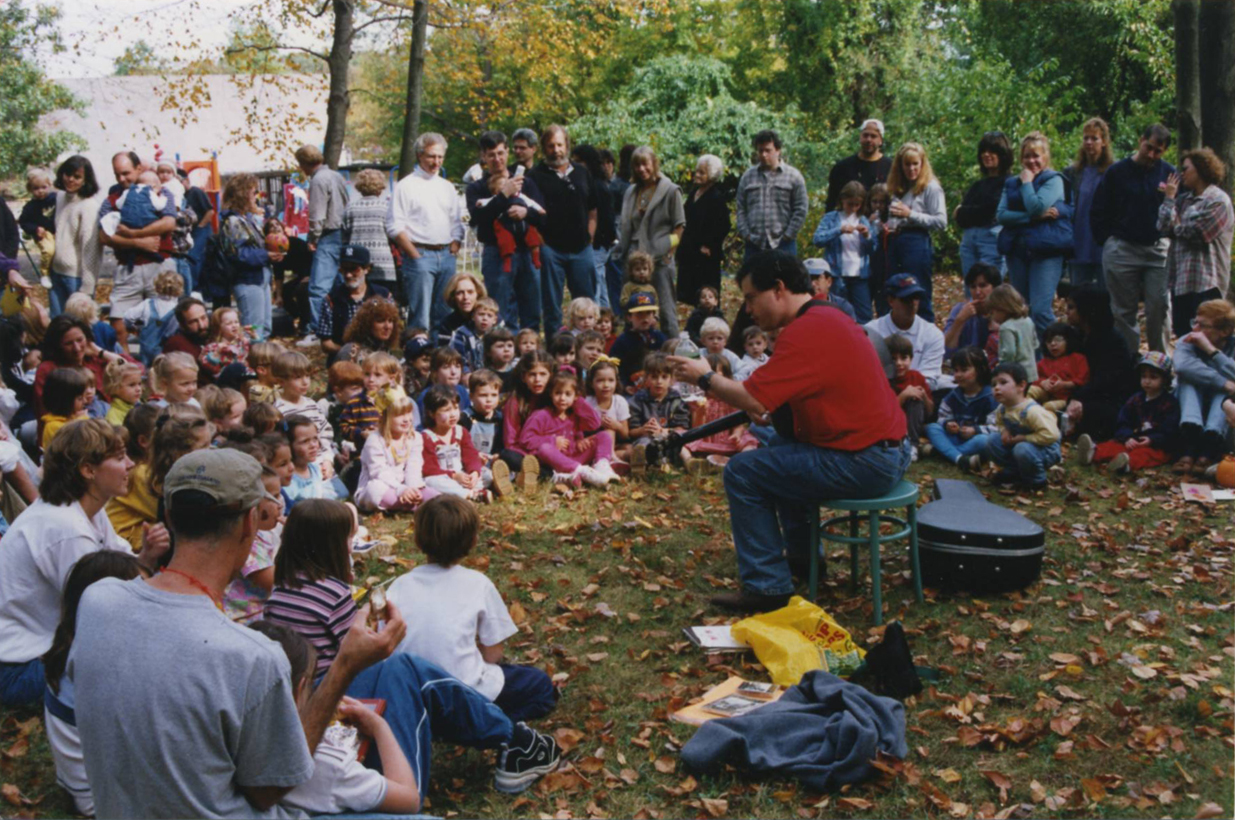
Performing in Mamaroneck in 1998

==== Graham & Delores ====
In 1996 Clarke approached John Reynolds to help him make his first album, Graham & Delores. Recorded at Arrigoni Center, a former Episcopal church, at Iona College on a TASCAM 4-track portastudio (borrowed from noted Thomas Merton scholar Kathleen Deignan), the album featured only Clarke and his guitar with no over-dubbing. It was released in 1997 selling out the original run of over 1000 units strictly at his local shows by 1998.

==== Graham & Cinnamon ====
Branching out in 1999, Clarke followed up with a second album Graham & Cinnamon which featured a much more studio produced sound. Again, he went to John Reynolds for production assistance. Reynolds brought him to the (now defunct) Nu Bleu Recording Studio in Garfield, NJ run by Andy Halasz. The instrumentation expanded well beyond Clarke and his guitar. Reynolds contributed invaluably to this album by providing arrangements and playing every instrument on the album besides Graham's guitar. Songs like "If I Live to Be 100" and "Grandma Can You Jump?" benefitted greatly from Reynolds instrumentation (including playing the drums, which Reynods had never played before) and the recording experience he brought with him from The Goatmen and Every Damn Day. Clarke started to receive airplay on local radio stations, premiering on WPLJ's "Scott and Todd: The Big Show".

==== American Blue ====
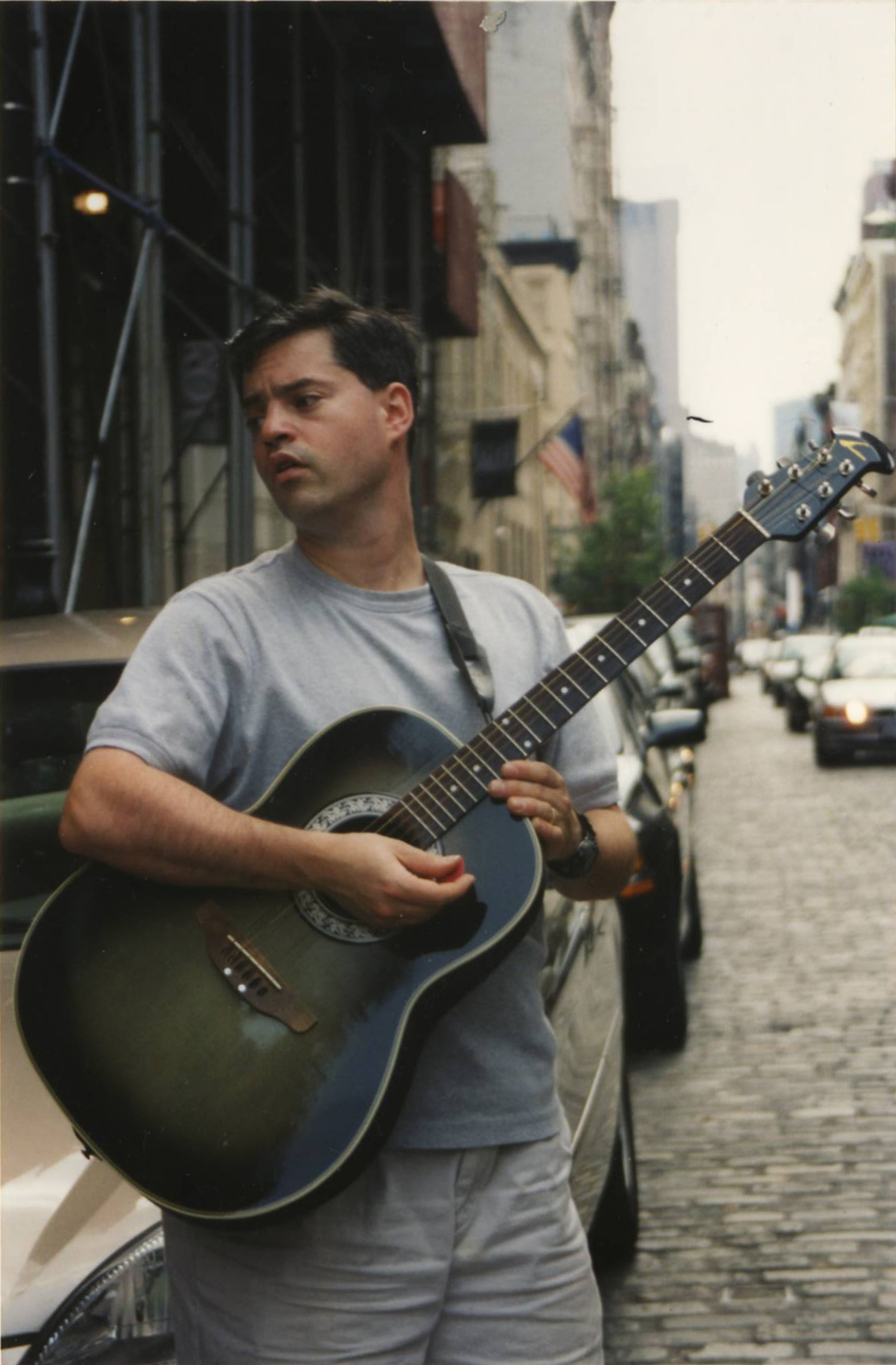
' In New York City, 2002

Released in June 2001, American Blue again saw Clarke moving further out of his one-man-one-guitar recordings. This time he brought on his brother Tommy Clarke to help produce. They recorded over a weekend at the studio of Jazz-o-lution bassist's Marshall Topo, with whom he had worked for Carla Henderson's "Your Tiny" videos) in Port Chester, NY. The album's crown jewel, "Fancy Pants", is a paean to one of Clarke's musical heroes, David Bowie. But many of Clarke's songs are clearly the product by his local work with groups of children in the Lower Hudson Valley region of New York and Clarke has said at his live shows that "Jack, Jack, Jackson and Jason" are four actual boys from one of his music classes. Always assuming intelligence on the part of the child, Clarke arranged a version of the Christmas carol 'We Three Kings" incorporated elements from Mozart's Requiem Mass, especially the vocal portion of "Lacrimosa dies illa". American Blue also featured Clarke's first a cappella recording, a reworking of the Georgia Sea Island folksong "Old Lady Come from Brewster" using only his voice for the instruments. The album's Sword and Shield is noted "for Peg", a dedication to his wife.

After the September 11 attacks in 2001, Clarke made an album devoted entirely to New York. Recorded at Tommy's home in Cambridge, Acoustic New York was released on the one-year anniversary of the 9-11 attacks.

In 2004, Clarke released FiVE.

== Television and video ==
It was during the production of American Blue that Clarke started to branch into children's video. He made the "Quills Up!" video for the American Association of Poison Control Centers with producer Jonathan Katz and provided music for the "Your Tiny" series of videos produced by Carla Henderson for Child Smart. Clarke also looked into landing his own children's television show. After being approached by a television network executive mother and an inspiring meeting with Sesame Street's Gordon, Clarke began work on a TV pilot with actor-writer Brian Reid. But the experience was cut short by sour experiences with personalities in the television industry and by the economic aftermath following the September 11 attacks.

Clarke has been a frequent guest on News 12 and other local TV stations. He often appears during special holiday segments, often appearing and singing with children.

== Philanthropy ==
Clarke has done benefits for many charities including the 2004 tsunami victims and Widows of 9/11. He enjoyed a 15-month-long weekly performance at Blythedale Children's Hospital. Clarke also donates performances annually to The Red Cross, Kids in Crisis, multiple Junior Leagues, as well as many local charities, schools, and libraries.

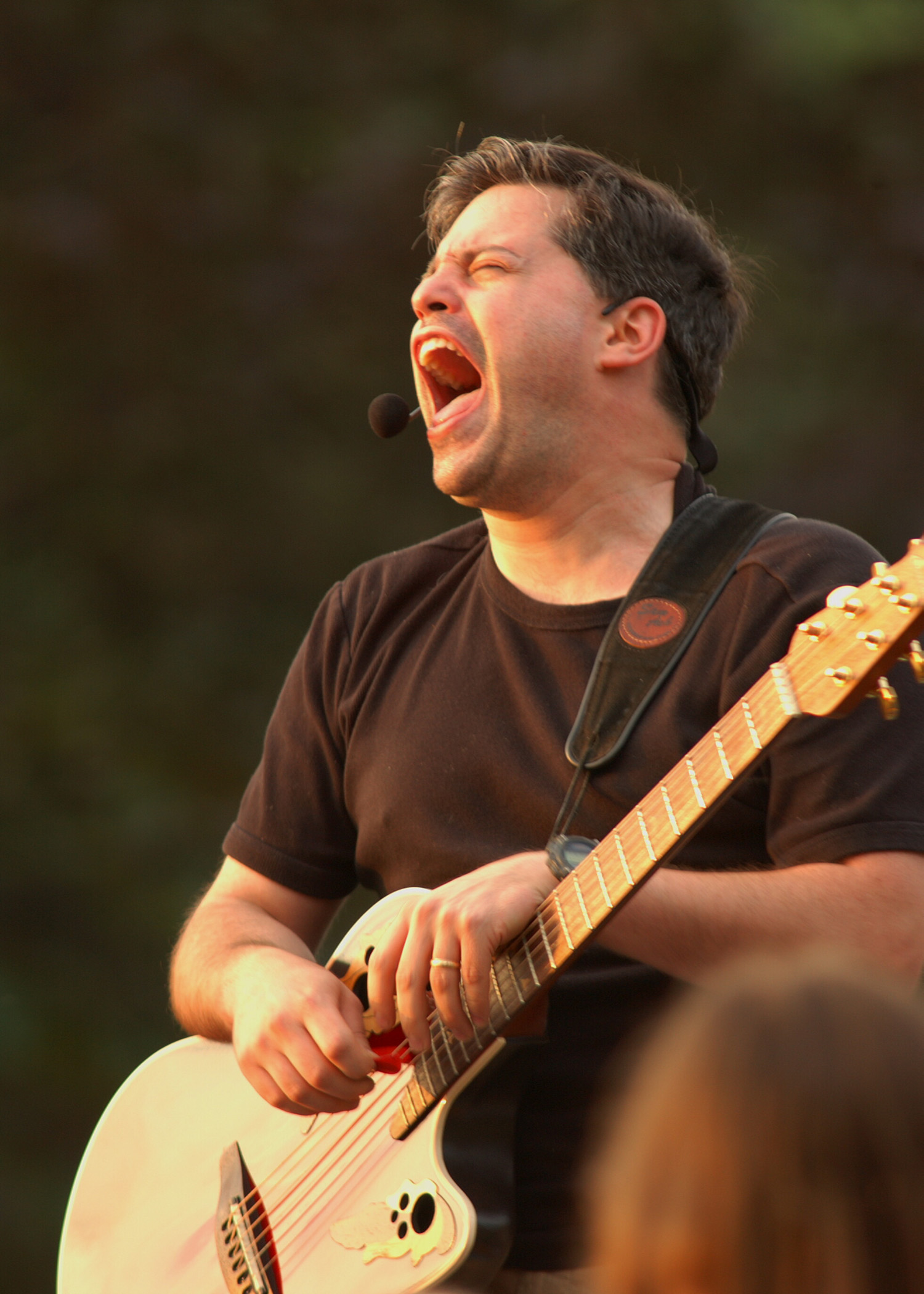
Graham Clarke performing in Bedford, NY in 2003 holding his guitar, Cinnamon

== Personal life ==
Clarke is first cousin to film score composer Alan Silvestri.

Graham has been married to his wife Peggy since May 28, 1994. Peggy is currently senior minister at Community Church of New York. They live in Somers, New York. They have a child, Zachary. Clarke was raised Roman Catholic, but left the faith by his time at Boston College. Though technically not a member, he does frequently attend services and perform at the Unitarian Universalists. He also sees his family frequently and all four brothers make an annual trip to a different city to watch a live professional hockey game. He is a dog lover and has owned dogs his entire adult life, often including them in his songs ("Come on Up, Athena", "Man in the Moon").

He is a resident of Somers, New York.

== Discography ==
- Graham & Delores (1997)
- Graham & Cinnamon (1999)
- American Blue (2001)
- Acoustic New York (2003)
- Five (2005)
- Hoggin' the Covers (2012)
