= St. Louis Jesuits =

20th-century group of Jesuit composers of worship music

- Origin: St. Louis, Missouri
- Genres: Contemporary Catholic liturgical music
- Years active: 1970–1985, 2005
- Labels: NALR, OCP
- Members: Bob Dufford, S.J.; John Foley, S.J.; Tim Manion; Roc O'Connor, S.J.; Dan Schutte

The St. Louis Jesuits are a group of Catholic composers who composed music for worship most often in a folk music style of church music in their compositions and recordings, mainly from their heyday in the 1970s through the mid-1980s. Made up of Jesuit scholastics at St. Louis University, the group initially used acoustic guitars and contemporary-style melodies and rhythms to set biblical and other religious texts to music sung in English in response to the liturgical reforms of the Second Vatican Council.

John Kavanaugh, also a Jesuit and composer, never worked with the group; however, a few of his compositions were included in the first collection, "Neither Silver Nor Gold," which was produced before the original members decided to further collaborate and record together.

== History ==
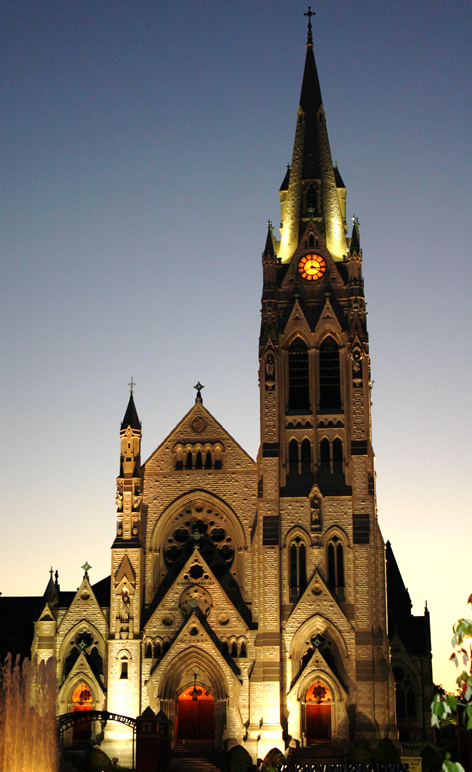
St. Louis University College Church, home of St. Louis Jesuits

Some of the music was recorded in the basement of Fusz Memorial Chapel, the rest at a local studio. After the groundswell of interest in their music and liturgies, this first collection of 58 songs, some dating back as early as 1964, was called Neither Silver nor Gold and included music by Bob Dufford, S.J., John Foley, S.J., Tim Manion, and Dan Schutte. The original purpose of the recording was only to leave behind their music for others to use as the composers were leaving for other assignments. Schutte hand-scribed the original music to be copied into binders for the Society of Jesus to distribute with the tape recordings. Later, this recording was issued as a four-cassette/LP set in 1974 by North American Liturgy Resources. It has since been remastered into a two-CD set by OCP Publications with about half a dozen songs left off the LP/cassette version due to space limitations. Their music compositions were written as individuals but they participated as a group on many of their recordings. They soon became known as the St. Louis Jesuits.

Later, Roc O'Connor, S.J. joined the original collaborators. At the time, all were members of the Society of Jesus; however, Manion would neither complete his studies, nor be ordained. He continued to collaborate with the group until 1984.

Pursuing different vocations and graduate studies afterward, the group reunited several times between 1975 and 1985 to write and record their various collections of music, published at the time by North American Liturgy Resources and available through Oregon Catholic Press. As they continued their studies and time permitted, they presented numerous workshops and presentations about liturgy and liturgical music at conferences throughout the United States and Canada. Over time, new arrangements for organ and full orchestration were created for more traditional settings.

Their second recording Earthen Vessels sold over one million albums, and resulted in hymnals such as Glory and Praise.

In 1980, all five members moved to Seattle, where they continued to study and compose new music. Tim Manion left the group in 1984 to pursue other interests but later released a solo collection, There is a River. After their fifth album, The Steadfast Love, was recorded in 1985, the members began to release solo collections, as their vocations and interests took them to different parts of the world. Dan Schutte left the Jesuit order in 1986, but like the others, he continued to compose and publish solo collections of music.

In 2000, Dufford, Foley, O'Connor, and Schutte made an appearance at the National Association of Pastoral Musicians. Thereafter, they wrote and recorded a collection of new music to celebrate the thirtieth anniversary of their collaboration. This recording entitled Morning Light was released in 2005 along with an anniversary coffee table book titled The St. Louis Jesuits: Thirty Years (Oregon Catholic Press, 2006). Tim Manion sang on the anniversary collection.

In November 2018, Dufford, Foley, Manion, and O’Connor appeared at St. Louis University’s “Happy 200th Birthday to SLU” Concert. They shared the stage with SLU’s St. Francis Xavier College Church Choir, the St. Louis University Master Singers, and the St. Louis Symphony Orchestra.

On September 29, 2019, the five members gathered in St. Louis, where it all began, for "Coming Home - A Final Celebration," a concert of gratitude at Powell Hall.

== Later life ==
After their capstone concert event, "Coming Home - A Final Celebration" in St. Louis in 2019, the group took their final bow of gratitude. All five members returned to St Louis University to receive 2021 honorary degrees for their legacy contributions to liturgical music and were awarded Doctor of Music, Honoris Causa, St Louis University.

Bob Dufford is Retreat Center Chaplain at Creighton University. John Foley, now retired, was the founding director of the Stroble Center for Liturgy at Saint Louis University. Tim Manion resides in the Seattle area. Roc O'Connor is a minister at Bellarmine Jesuit Retreat House, Barrington, IL. Dan Schutte, is composer-in-residence at the University of San Francisco. He continues as a composer, an author and in demand presenter.

== Recognition ==
- Grammy Nominations for The St. Louis Jesuits: 1976, 1977, 1978, 1980, and 2002.
- Doctor of Humane Letters, Honoris Causa, University of Scranton, 1980.
- Alumni Merit Award, St. Louis University, 1981.
- Distinguished Alumni Award, Seattle University, 1983.
- Doctor of Music, Honoris Causa, Creighton University, 2006.
- The Jubilate Deo Award, the National Association of Pastoral Musicians, 2011.
- Doctor of Music, Honoris Causa, St Louis University, 2021

This list includes honors received as a group. Individual members of the group have also received numerous honors and awards independently.

== Studio albums ==
- Neither Silver Nor Gold (1974)
- Earthen Vessels (1975)
- A Dwelling Place (1976)
- Gentle Night: Music for Advent and Christmas (1977)
- Lord of Light (1981)
- The Steadfast Love (1985)
- Morning Light (2005)

== Compilations ==
- Lift Up Your Hearts (1996)
- May We Praise You (1997)
- Let Heaven Rejoice (1997)
- Coming Home: A Final Celebration (2019)
