= Here I Am, Lord =

Hymn written by Dan Schutte

"Here I Am, Lord", also known as "I, the Lord of Sea and Sky" after its opening line, is a Christian hymn written by the American composer of Catholic liturgical music Dan Schutte in 1979 and published in 1981. Its words are based on Isaiah 6:8 and 1 Samuel 3:4. It is published by OCP Publications.

Schutte wrote the song at age 31 when he was studying theology at the Jesuit School of Theology at Berkeley. He was requested to compose, on short notice, a piece for the ordination Mass of a deacon, incorporating in the lyrics God's word, of Jesus as the light, and the bread and wine of the Eucharist.

Schutte's hymn is also sung in many Protestant worship services and is found in multiple hymnals and missalettes.

In 2004 a survey conducted by the Tablet, an international Catholic magazine, reported "Here I Am, Lord" as readers' favorite. A poll conducted by the National Association of Pastoral Musicians found among members that it came in second among "songs that make a difference".

In 2013 a survey conducted by Songs of Praise, "Here I Am, Lord" was named the fifth most popular hymn in Britain.

In 2017 America ran an article detailing the impact this song has had on the spirituality of American Catholics.

In 2019 "I, the Lord of Sea and Sky" was voted the United Kingdom's 10th favorite hymn.
