= Alexander Peloquin =

American composer

C. Alexander Peloquin (June 16, 1918 – February 27, 1997) was an American composer of liturgical music, pianist, teacher, cathedral organist and director of music ministries. Inspired by the Second Vatican Council reforms, he is known for composing the first Roman Catholic Mass sung in English.

== Biography ==
Peloquin was born in Northbridge, Massachusetts, the son of Noe G. and Marie Louise (Bernard) Peloquin. Peloquin began his musical training at the age of eight, studying piano and organ. At the age of eleven, he performed classical piano on his own radio program for WTAG in Worcester, Massachusetts. Peloquin went on to study at the New England Conservatory where he earned a Boston Symphony Orchestra Scholarship to the Berkshire Music Center at Tanglewood. At Tanglewood, Peloquin served as piano soloist for Leonard Bernstein and his orchestra. Also at that time, Peloquin had the privilege of knowing Aaron Copland. Peloquin was awarded honorary degrees by institutions including Brown University.

During World War II, Peloquin served in the Army where he achieved the rank of Lieutenant. He served as bandmaster for the 314th Army Band and performed the music of George Gershwin for servicemen serving throughout Europe and North Africa. He also conducted music for Jewish, Catholic and Protestant services.

After the war Peloquin began a 13-year relationship with The Catholic Hour, which was syndicated first on NBC radio and then on CBS television. In 1950, Peloquin became the organist and Director of Music Ministries of the Cathedral of Saints Peter and Paul (Providence, Rhode Island) and remained until his retirement in 1991. As director he formed the Peloquin Chorale, an organization of singers who of performed and premiered Peloquin's compositions over the years in concerts, liturgies and recordings. In 1955, Peloquin became a faculty member and composer-in-residence at Boston College, a career that spanned 38 years. He was also the conductor of the college's Glee Club and immediately set out to broaden the repertoire of the choir by including women when the college became co-ed in 1970. The choir went on to become the University Chorale of Boston College. Both the Peloquin Chorale and the University Chorale of Boston College were instrumental in introducing his most innovative compositions to the world and often performed together during most of the premier performances of Peloquin's works.

Some prominent events in Peloquin's career include:

1964 – During National Liturgical Week in St. Louis, Missouri, Peloquin unveiled the first English High Mass ever sung in the United States. This event elevated Peloquin to national prominence as one of the few classically trained composers inspired by the reforms set out in the Second Vatican Council.

1968 – After the April assassination of Martin Luther King Jr., Peloquin collaborated with poet Thomas Merton on his composition "Four Freedom Songs", in honor of Dr. King. The work was first performed at Ebenezer Baptist Church, just months after King was slain.

1979 – Peloquin conducted a choir of 300 for a Mass celebrated by Pope John Paul II in Chicago's Grant Park (Chicago). This Mass was attended by 1.5 million people. During the Pope's visit in America at this time, Peloquin's music was performed at every Mass on the Pope's itinerary.

1980 – Dave Brubeck selected Peloquin and the Peloquin Chorale to premier his Mass To Hope! A Celebration, (formally known as To Hope! A Mass for a New Decade) in celebration of his conversion to Catholicism.

Peloquin died February 27, 1997, at the Bethany Home in Providence, Rhode Island, from the effects of a stroke he suffered on February 12 of the same year. Peloquin never married and had no children. A sister survived him.

== Music ==
Peloquin wrote more than 150 scores. Most of his music is written for SATB choir and soloists as well as for women's voices (SSA), men's voices (3 parts) and involves a combination of piano, organ and orchestra. Peloquin also made a point of composing melodies with simple refrains to encourage participation of the congregation. "A lot of religious music today is boring," he once said, "and I don't think worship calls us to boredom." His music combines traditional music written for the church with elements of Gregorian chant, jazz-like rhythms and harmonies reminiscent of George Gershwin, Aaron Copland and Leonard Bernstein. Alex was also interested in incorporating syncopated rhythms into several of his compositions. An example of this can be found in his Lord of Life Mass commissioned by Terence Cardinal Cooke Archbishop of New York in 1980. Titled "People Matter" the composition is an arrangement based on a hymn by Dutch composer Fred Kaan (1929–2009). It is intended to be performed during Offertory and it begins with the syncopated rhythms of percussion and double bass where after two measures the altos are joined by trumpet "con sordino".

Many of his compositions were in response to commissions from churches, universities and religious orders throughout the United States and Canada. The texts used in these compositions were based upon the writings of a wide range of religious thinkers of all faiths, including Pope John Paul II.

=== Works ===
Key:

  - BPL- Boston Public Library Music Dept., Research Division, Copley Square, Boston, MA 02117
  - HU- Harvard University, Eda Kuhn Loeb Music Library, Cambridge, MA 02138
  - G.I.A.- Gregorian Institute of America
  - ms. – manuscript

- Ecce sacerdos (1954) For: SATB and organ. Text: Roman Liturgy, Dedicated to the Most Rev. Russell J. McVinney, D.D., the Bishop of Providence. Vocal score: McLaughlin, 1954. BPL. LP: Gregorian Institute Records, 1961.
- Ecce sacerdos (1954) For: chorus (unison) and organ. Text: Roman liturgy. Vocal score: McLaughlin, 1954.
- Happy Holiday, O Welcome! (1954) For: chorus (mixed). Text: Anon. Dedicated to: Theodore Marier. Vocal score: McLaughlin 1954, BPL. Vocal score: G.I.A.
- Our Father (1954) For: chorus (mixed). Text: Bible, N.T., Matthew 6:9–13. Dedication: In memory of my father. Used for several years by WEAM-AM, Providence, Rhode Island, as a sign-off. Vocal score: McLaughlin 1955. BPL. LP: Hymns Thru the Centuries, Gregorian Institute Records.
- Upon This Night (1954) For: SATB and organ. Text: Omer Goulet. Dedication: To my mother. Vocal score: McLaughlin, 1954, Vocal score: G.I.A.
- Hail Mary (1954) For: chorus (mixed). Text: Anon. Vocal score: McLaughlin, 1954. BPL. LP: Hymns Thru the Centuries, Gregorian Institute Records.
- Ave Maria (1955) For: SATB and organ (optional). Vocal score: World Library of Sacred Music, 1955. BPL
- Four Choral Processionals (1955) For: TTB or TTBB. Text: Hymns of the Catholic Church. Vocal score: World Library of Sacred Music, 1955. BPL

Holy God We Praise Thy Name
The God Whom Earth and Sea
O Mary of All Women
Blessed Be Our God

- Motets for Benediction (1955) For: voices (equal) (3). Dedicated to: The Men's Choir, Cathedral of Saints Peter and Paul, Providence, Rhode Island. Vocal score: World Library of Sacred Music, 1955. BPL

O Saving Victim
Hail Star of the Sea
Therefore We
Before Him Bending
Give Praise to the Lord

- Missa Sancti Bernadi (1956) For: chorus (mixed). Dedicated to: Alexander Bernard (died 1918 in France).
- O Blessed Trinity (1956) For: chorus (unison) and organ. Text: Roman Liturgy Vocal Score: World Library of Sacred Music.
- Noel nouvelet (1957) For: SATB. Dedicated to The Welch Chorale N.Y.C.. Vocal score: Flammer. LP: Christmas Carols and Noels, Gregorian Institute Records. Peloquin Chorale.
- Missa Christus Rex (1957–58) For: chorus (treble), chorus (men, 3 – part), trumpets (3), timpani, organ. Commissioned for: 50th Anniversary of Archbishop Cicognani. First performed: 1958: Trinity College Chapel, Washington D.C. Seminarians. Score and parts: G.I.A. Vocal score: G.I.A., 1958. BPL
- Kyrie and Gloria from Missa Christus Rex (1957–58) For: chorus (treble), chorus (men, 3 – part), trumpets (3), timpani, organ. LP: Thirteen Centuries of Christian Choral Art, Gregorian Institute Records E1-100, 197-.
- March for Joyous Occasions (1958) For: organ. Score: McLaughlin, 1958. BPL
- Turba Choruses from the Passion of St. Matthew as Sung on the Second Sunday of the Passion (1958) For: chorus (men) (3 – part). Text: Liber usualis. Dedicated to: Russell Davis. First performed 1958, St. John's Seminary, Boston. Vocal score: McLaughlin, 1958. BPL
- The Lourdes Hymn (1958) For: SATB. Vocal score: McLaughlin, 1958. BPL
- Hommage a Purcell (1958)For: organ. Commissioned by: McLaughlin and Reilly. Dedicated to: Berj Zamkochian. Score: McLaughlin, 1968
- Partita on the Lourdes Hymn (1959) For: organ, 10 movements. Dedicated to: Flor Peeters, Belgium. Score: McLaughlin, 1959. BPL
- Laudate Dominum: Give Praise to the Lord (1959) For: chorus (mixed), trumpets (3), trombones (3), tuba, timpani, organ. Winner of Caecilia Medal (Boys Town). Dedicated to: James B. Welch and The Welch Chorale N.Y.C. (1959) Vocal score: G.I.A., 1959.
- Introit for All Saints Day (1960) 3', For: chorus (SATB). Text: Roman Liturgy. Dedicated to: Henry Hokans. First performed: Nov.1, 1960; Worcester, Massachusetts.
- Missa nativitatis (1960) 20' For: chorus (treble)(2-part) and chamber orchestra (1-1-0-0-; 0-0-0-0; timp; org; str). Dedicated to: Rev. Norman Leboeuf. First performed: December 25, 1960: in NBC Catholic Hour. St. Bernard's Boys choir, Pittsburgh, Pennsylvania. Vocal score: G.I.A.
- Missa pentatonica (1960) 15' For: chorus (unison) and organ. Dedicated to: Brother Basil, S.C., Basutoland, South Africa. Vocal score: G.I.A.
- Ave Verum (1961) 3’ For: chorus (SATB). Text: Roman Liturgy. Dedicated to Walter Burke and the Burke Family Singers. Vocal score: McLaughlin, 1961.
- Christ is King (1961) 3’ For: chorus (men), trumpets (2), trombones (2), tuba, timpani, organ. Score and parts: World Library of Sacred Music. Vocal score: World Library of Sacred Music. 1961
- Hymn of Triumph (1962) 5' For: chorus (3-part) and organ or orchestra (1–1–1–1; 3–3–2–0; timp; str.). Commissioned by: Boston College for its centennial. Score and parts: manuscript. Vocal score: McLaughlin, 1962.
- Choral Precision: A Book of Vocal Exercises(1962) For: SSA or SATB and piano. Vocal Score: G.I.A., 1962
- Hymnus angelorum (1962) 4' 15" For: chorus (men)(3-part), timpani, organ or piano. Text: Goria in excelsis Deo from the Roman Liturgy. Commissioned by: Berj Zamkochian. Vocal score: McLaughlin, 1962.
- Missa Domini (1962–63) 20' For: chorus (men)(3-part), congregation, orchestra (1–1–1–1; 3–3–2–1; timp; str.). Commissioned by: Boston College for its centennial. First performed: March 30, 1963; Holy Cross Cathedral, Boston. Boston College University Chorale, Festival Orchestra, C. Alexander Peloquin, conductor. Score and parts: McLaughlin. Vocal score: Mclaughlin, 1963. BPL
- Hic est Michael (1963) For: chorus (SAB) and organ. Commissioned for: 75th anniversary of the Church of St. Michael, Rochester, New York. Vocal score: McLaughlin.
- Mass in English (1963) 15' For: chorus (mixed), Congregation, trumpets (2)(optional), trombones (2)(optional), timpani (optional), organ. Commissioned by: Liturgical Conference of Washington, D.C., 1963. First performed: August 1964; St. Louis, Missouri National Choir. Vocal score: McLaughlin, 1964. BPL
- Toccata (1963) 6' For: organ. Dedicated to: Berj Zamkochain. First performed: April 7, 1963: Symphony Hall, Boston. Berj Zamkochain. Score: McLaughlin.
- Angelic Acclamations (1964) 4’ For: chorus (SAB) and organ. Text: Bible, N.T., Revelations 7:12 Vocal score: McLaughlin, 1964.
- The Bells (1964) 10’ For: chorus (mixed), percussion, bells, pianos (2), celeste, double basses (2). Text: Edgar Allan Poe. Commissioned by Brown University for its bicentennial. Score and parts: Boosey & Hawkes. Vocal score: Boosey & Hawkes, 1964. BPL, HU
- Why, O Lord, Do You Stand Aloof? (1964) For: Chorus (SATB). Commissioned by: Liturgical Conference of Washington, D.C. First performed: Aug 27, 1964; St. Louis, Missouri, National Choir, C. Alexander Peloquin, conductor. Vocal score: G.I.A.
- I Will Bless the Lord (1964) For: Chorus (mixed) and congregation. Commissioned by: Liturgical Conference of Washington D.C. First performed: Aug 27, 1964; St. St. Louis, Missouri, National Choir, C. Alexander Peloquin, conductor. Vocal score: McLaughlin, 1964.
- How Lovely is Your Dwelling Place (1964) 6' For: cantor, chorus (3 part), congregation. Dedicated to Rev. Richard Wojcik, Chicago, Illinois. Vocal score: G.I.A.
- I Will Give Thanks to You, O Lord (1964) For: chorus (SATB), congregation, organ. Commissioned by: Liturgical Conference of Washington D.C. First performed: Aug 27, 1964; St. St. Louis, Missouri, National Choir, C. Alexander Peloquin, conductor. Vocal score: World Library of Sacred Music.
- Te Deum (1964) For: chorus (SATB) and orchestra(2–2–2–2; 4–3–3–1; perc, glock; hp; pf(2), org; str.). Canticle. Text: Roman Liturgy. Commissioned by: St. Joseph College, Rensselaer, Indiana, on the occasion of its Diamond Jubilee. First performed: April 12, 1964; Rennslaer, Indiana, Alverno College Chorus; St. Joseph College Chorus; members of the gary Symphony Orchestra; Theophane Hytreck, organ. Score, parts, and vocal score: World library of Sacred Music, 1964.
- Song of Zachary (1965) 3' 15" For: chorus (SATB). Canticle. Text: Bible, New Testament, Luke 1:68–79. Dedicated to: Joseph Michaud, St. Bernards Church, Pittsburgh, Pennsylvania. Vocal score: G.I.A.
- Song of Daniel (1965) 2' 50" For: cantor, chorus (mixed), congregation, brasses, timpani, organ. Vocal score: G.I.A., 1965. LP: Mass for Joy, Gregorian Institute Records, 1966.
- Song of Daniel, Arr., (1965) 3' 30", For: cantor, chorus (men)(4-part), congregation, trumpets (2), trombones (2), timpani, organ. Score: G.I.A., 1965, BPL. Vocal score: G.I.A., 1965
- Four Prayers for Christian Unity (1965) For: chorus (mixed), brasses, timpani. Commissioned by: Liturgical conference of Washington, D.C. First performed: August, 1965; Chicago, Illinois. Convention Choir. Vocal score: G.I.A.

Psalm for Unity
Prayer for Peace
In Christ the Lord
The Bread is One, LP: Missa a la samba, Gregorian Institute records M/S 124, 197-. Peloquin Chorale, C. Alexander Peloquin, conductor. WCRB

- Alleluia on a Byzantine Hymn (1965) 1’25” For: chorus (SATB). Text: Bible. Vocal score: McLaughlin, 1965.
- Mass for Parishes (1965) 15' For: cantor, chorus (unison), congregation. Commissioned by: Stonehill College. Dedicated to George Pelletier. Vocal score: McLaughlin, 1965.
- Triple Amen (1965) 30" For: chorus (mixed) and congregation. Commissioned by: Liturgical Conference of Washington, D.C. First performed: August 27, 1964; St. Louis, Missouri, National Choir, C. Alexander Peloquin, conductor. Vocal score: Summy Birchard.
- Mass for Joy (1966) 6' 55" For: chorus (SATB), trumpets (2), trombones (2), timpani, guitar, organ, double bass. Dedicated to: Youth of America. First performed: 12/1966; Providence, Rhode Island. Peloquin Chorale. Score and parts: G.I.A., 1967, BPL LP: Gregorian Institute Records GIA 113C, 196-. Peloquin Chorale and Orchestra, C. Alexander Peloquin, conductor. WCRB
- Christmas Concerto (1966) 15’ For: organ and chamber orchestra (1–2–0–1; 1–0–0–0; timp; str.) Dedicated to Daniel Durand. First performed: Phoenix, Ariz, Daniel Durand, organ: C. Alexander Peloquin, conductor. Score and Parts: manuscripts.

March of the Magi
Pastoral
Dance of the Shepherds

- Festival Mass (1966) For: voice, chorus, organ chamber orchestra (1-1-0-0-); 0–3–2–0: cel, org; str (0-0-0-2-0) Commissioned by: Diocese of St. Augustine for the celebration of the 400th anniversary of the city. First performed: St Augustine, Florida. Barry College Tara Singers and the Boston College University Chorale; members of the Jacksonville Symphony, C. Alexander Peloquin, conductor. Score and Parts: G.I.A. Vocal score: G.I.A. 1966, LP: Mass for Joy, Gregorian Institute Records, GIA 113C, 196-. Peloquin Chorale, C. Alexander Peloquin, conductor. WCRB.
- Honey from the Rock (1966) For: chorus (SA), congregation, trumpets(2), trombones (3), timpani, organ. Dedicated to: Rev. Robert Ryan, Director of Music, Archdiocese of Detroit. Vocal score: World Library of Sacred Music, 1966.
- Chorale (1967) 4’ For: chamber orchestra (1–2–0–1; 1–2–2–0; timp; str.) Based on O Haupt voll Blut und Wunden. First performed: Palm Sunday 1967 in CBS-TV program, In Praise of the Lord. Score and parts: manuscripts.
- Christ, the Light of the Nations (1967) 5’ 20” For: chorus (2-part), congregation, instrumental ensemble, trumpets (3), trombones (2), bongos (3), organ, double bass. Text: Church in the Modern World, (Vatican II). Commissioned by: Archbishop John Quinn, First performed: Dec 1967 San Diego, Calif. Franciscan students of San Luis Rey Mission.
- Fanfare (1967) 2’ For: chamber orchestra (1–2–0–1; 1–2–2–0; timp; str.) Based on the Gregorian chant, Christus vincit. Commissioned by Columbia Broadcasting System. First performed: Palm Sunday 1967; in CBS-TV program, In Praise of the Lord. Score and parts: manuscripts.
- L'Hymne de l'univers (1967) 15'. For: Tenor, chorus(mixed), organ, instrumental ensemble; horns(2), trumpets (3), trombones(2), timpani, harp. organ, double bass. Text: Pierre Teilhard de Chardin. Written for closing Mass for EXPO 67, Montreal, Quebec. First performed: October, 1967, Montreal, Quebec. Robert Peters, tenor: Chorale de Vaudreuil. Score and parts: manuscripts. Vocal score: manuscripts.
- Love is Everlasting (1967) 9'15" For: cantor, chorus (SATB) or chorus (equal voices), organ or brasses, timpani, double bass. Text: Bible, Old Testament, Daniel. Dedicated to: Bishop James A. Hickey. First performed: June 1967, Seattle Washington. Singers from the Diocese of Seattle and members of the Seattle Youth Orchestra, C. Alexander Peloquin, conductor. Vocal score: G.I.A., 1967 BPL. LP: Mass for Joy, Gregorian Institute Records GIA 113C, 196-. Peloquin Chorale. C. Alexander Peloquin, conductor. WCRB
- Song of Thanksgiving (1967) 4' For: chorus (SATB) and organ. Text: Bible, Old Testament. Written for the celebration of the centennial of the confederation of Canada. First performed: Oct 9, 1967; Calgary, Alta. Vocal score: manuscript.
- Song of Hope (1969) For: chorus (mixed), timpani, harp, chimes, double bass, organ. Text: Hubert Van Zeller. Dedicated to: Josephine Morgan. First performed: Aug 1969; Manhattanville College. Score and parts: manuscript. Vocal score: manuscript.
- Missa a la samba (1970) 7'52" For: celebrant, cantor, chorus (SATB), percussion, organ. Vocal score: G.I.A. Disc: Gregorian Institute Records, GIA M/S 124, 197-. American Brass Quintet.
- Open the Door (1970) 3' 56" For: cantor, chorus, brasses, organ. Text: Mickey Kenney. Written for St. Mary of the Bay, Warren, Rhode Island, for the dedication of the new church. Dedicated to: David Coffey. Parts: G.I.A.
- Shout for Joy, (1970) 4' 28" For: cantor, chorus (SATB), congregation, trumpets(3), trombones(2), percussion, organ. Dedicated to: Dr. Hollis Grant, director of St. Dunstan Conference on Sacred Music. Vocal score: in Songs of Israel, G.I.A.
- Carol Fantasy (1971) For: chorus (SATB) and organ and string orchestra. Based on the Coventry Carol and Puer nobis nascitur. Commissioned by: Church of St. Dominic, Shaker Heights, Ohio. Score and parts: manuscripts.
- My God, My God (1971) 4' For: cantor, chorus (SATB), congregation. Commissioned by: Gregorian Institute of America. Dedicated to: Robert Batastini. Vocal score: in Songs of Israel, G.I.A., BPL.
- Taste and See (1971) 4' For: chorus (SATB) and congregation. Commissioned by: Gregorian Institute of America. Vocal score: Songs of Israel, G.I.A., BPL
- Resurrection Psalm (1971) 3' For: cantor, chorus (SATB), congregation. Vocal score: in Songs of Israel, G.I.A.
- God Mounts His Throne (1971) 3' For: cantor, chorus (SATB), congregation, brasses, strings. Commissioned by: Gregorian Institute of America. Vocal score and parts: ms. Vocal score: Songs of Israel, G.I.A., BPL
- Contemplation (1971) 5'6" For: organ. Dedicated to: Marilyn Mason. Score: Sacred Music, 1971. Disc: in Missa a la samba, Gregorian Institute Records, GIA M/S 124, 197-. C. Alexander Pleoquin, organ. WCRB
- Lord, You Have the Words (1971) 4' For: chorus (SATB) and congregation. Commissioned by: Gregorian Institute of America. Vocal score: in Songs of Israel, G.I.A.., BPL
- I Believe That My Redeemer Lives (1971) For: chorus (SATB) and organ. Text: Bible. Commissioned by: Margaret Pierce, London, Ont. Vocal score: G.I.A.
- We Are His People (1971) 3' For: chorus (SATB) and congregation. Vocal score: in Song of Israel, G.I.A.
- Joy (1971) For: Organ. Suite. Commissioned by Sacred Music Press. Dedicated to: Berj Zamkochian, Marilyn Mason, Gerre Hancock. Score: Sacred Music.

Prelude
Dance
Interlude
Contemplation
Joy

- Alleluia! In All Things! For: voices(equal)(2) or chorus(2-part), organ, instruments(optional). Vocal score: G.I.A.
- Have Mercy on Me (1971) 3' For: cantor, chorus (SATB), congregation. Commissioned by: Gregorian Institute of America. Vocal score: in Songs of Israel, G.I.A.
- Lord, Every Nation (1971) 4' For: chorus (SATB), congregation, brasses, harp, timpani. Commissioned by: St. Michael Church, London, Ont. score and parts: ms. Vocal score: in Songs of Israel, G.I.A.
- Lord, Send Out Your Spirit (1971) For: chorus (SATB), or congregation, trumpets(3), trombones(2), percussion, organ. Commissioned by: Gregorian Institute of America. Dedicated to: Rev. Robert Wallace, Toronto, Ontario. Vocal score: in Songs of Israel, G.I.A. 1972. BPL
- This Is the Day (1971) 4' For: cantor, chorus (SATB), congregation. Commissioned by: Gregorian Institute of America. Dedicated to: Cecilia Roy Kenny. Vocal Score: in Songs of Israel, G.I.A.,1972. BPL
- Mass of Resurrection (1971–72) 30' For: cantor, chorus (SATB), congregation. Dedicated to: William Campbell and the Fall River Singers. Vocal score: G.I.A.

Processional
Lord Have Mercy
Psalm
Holy Holy
Acclamation
Lamb of God
I Believe That My Redeemer Lives
May the Angels Lead You

- Mass of the Bells (1971–72) 20' For: chorus (mixed), congregation, organ, chamber orchestra. Vocal score: G.I.A.

Lord Have Mercy
Gloria of the Bells
Holy, Holy, Holy
Dying you Destroyed
Amen
Lamb of God

- Gloria of the Bells (1972) 4' For: cantor, chorus (SATB), congregation, trumpets (2), trombones (2), percussion, organ. Dedicated to: Monsignor William Carey. Vocal score: in Worship II G.I.A.
- Symphony of Praise (1972) 4' For: chorus(men)(3-part), congregation, orchestra(1-1-1-1-; 3–3–2–0; timp, str.) Commissioned by: Boston College for its centennial. Score, parts and vocal score: McLaughlin
- To You, O Lord (1972) 3' For: chorus (SATB). Commissioned by: Gregorian Institute of America. Vocal score: in Songs of Israel, G.I.A., BPL
- Rejoice in Hope (1972) 5' For: speaker, chorus (mixed), instrumental ensemble(horns(2), trumpets(2), trombones(2), percussion, harp, organ, double bass) Text: Bible, N.T. and Roman liturgy for Maundy Thursday. Score, parts, vocal score: G.I.A.
- Prayer of St. Francis (1973) 3' 15" For: chorus (SATB). Text: St. Francis of Assisi. Dedicated to Irene Simas. Vocal score: G.I.A.
- Psalm One Hundred (1973) 5' For: chorus (SATB), brasses, double bass, percussion, organ. Commissioned by: St. Dominic Church, Shaker Heights, Ohio. First performed (1974); Lincoln Center, New York City. Boston College University Chorale; Robert Plimpton, organ. Vocal score: G.I.A.
- Lyric Liturgy (1974) 44'46" For: cantor, chorus(mixed), congregation, brasses, timpani, organ. Text: Roman liturgy. Commissioned by: St. Mary's Seminary, Cleveland, Ohio. First performed: June 1974; Cleveland, Ohio. Diocesan chorus. Vocal score: G.I.A. Disc: Gregorian Institute Records M/S 144, 197-. Robert H. Oldershaw, celebrant; Stephen Szaraz, cantor; Robert Plimpton, organ; Peloquin Chorale and Orchestra; Boston College University Chorale. WCRB

Lord Jesus Come
Penitential Rite
Liturgy of the Word
Alleluia
Offertory
Liturgy of the Eucharist
Communion Rite
Faith Hope and Love
Gloria
Sacred Dance

- Celebration of Presence, Prayer and Praise (1974) 15' For: cantor, chorus(SATB), trumpets(3), trombones(2), timpani, percussion, organ. Commissioned by: Cardinal John Cody. First performed: August, 1974; Chicago, Illinois. Cathedral of the Holy Name Choir. Score and parts: G.I.A. Vocal score: G.I.A.
- God is in His Holy Place (1974) For: chorus (SATB), congregation, trumpets(2), trombones(2), timpani, organ. Vocal score, score and parts: G.I.A.
- Receive the Holy Spirit (1974) 3' For: cantor, chorus (SATB), congregation, organ. Text; Roman liturgy. Commissioned by: St. Mary's Seminary Cleveland, Ohio. Dedicated to: Most Rev. Michael J. Murphy. Vocal score: G.I.A.
- Gathering Song (1974) For: Voice, chorus, congregation, percussion, organ. Text: Kenneth Omernick. Vocal score: G.I.A.
- Jesus, Shepherd of Our Souls 4' (1974) For: chorus (SA) and organ. Text: from Plymouth Praise by Fred Kahn. Dedicated to: Elizabeth Walker. Vocal score: G.I.A.
- A Prayer for Us (1975) 8' For: speaker, voice, chorus (mixed), congregation, brasses, percussion, organ. Text: Book of Common Prayer (1928); David P. Watermulder. Commissioned by: Princeton Theological Seminary. Dedicated to: Robert Plimpton. First performed: May 1975; Bryn Mawr Presbyterian Church. Score, Parts and Vocal Score: G.I.A.
- I Am Forgotten (1975) 2' 30" For: Voice and piano. Text: Hubert Van Zeller. Dedicated to: Lucien Olivier. Score: manuscript.
- An American Liturgy (1975–76) 50' For: chorus (SATB), congregation, chamber orchestra. Commissioned by: St. Michael Church, Independence, Ohio. First performed: June, 1976. Parts: G.I.A. Vocal Score: G.I.A. Disc: Century Advent.
- Canticle of Brother Sun (1976) For: Cantor, chorus, congregation, trumpets(2), trombones(2), glockenspiel, harp, organ. Text: St. Francis of Assisi. First performed: 1975, Staten Island, New York.
- Winter Is Past (1975) 5' For: narrator, chorus, harp. Text: Bible, N.T., Luke. First performed: December 25, 1975.
- Canticle of Simeon (Nunc dimittis). (1976) 4' For: Baritone, chorus(SATB), organ. Text: Bible, N.T., Luke 2:29–32. Commissioned by: Diocese of Pittsburgh. First performed: Sept 5, 1980. Vocal score: G.I.A.
- Christ the Priest; Complete Ordination Liturgy (1976) 40' For: Cantor, congregation, brasses, percussion, organ. Text: Byzantine liturgy and Roman liturgy. Vocal score: G.I.A.
- Gloria in excelsis (1976) 4' For: cantor, chorus, congregation, brasses, timpani, percussion, organ. Commissioned by; Bishop Dozier. Score, parts, vocal score: G.I.A.
- Today Is Born Our Saviour: Responsorial Psalm for Christmas (1976) 4' For: Soprano, chorus(mixed), harp, chimes. Written in honor of the American Bicentennial. First performed: Dec 25, 1976; Providence, Rhode Island. Aired on ABC-TV.
- Te Deum (1976) For: chorus(mixed), congregation, organ, orchestra. Canticle. Text: Roman liturgy. Commissioned by: Sisters of Charity of Seton Hill College to celebrate the canonization of Elizabeth Ann Seton. Vocal score: G.I.A.
- Four Prayers (1977) 10' For: chorus (mixed) and organ. Text: Cardinal John Henry Newman; St. Bernard of Clairvaux; St. Augustine; Bible, N.T. Commissioned by: St. Dominic Church, Shaker Heights, Ohio. Vocal score: G.I.A.

Soul of Christ
Jesus!
Do Whatever He Tells
Sing Along the Road

- Colony Fantasia (1978) 8' For: chorus(mixed) and orchestra(1–1–1–1; 0–2–2–0; timp; str). Text: traditional folk songs and hymns.

Maria zu Lieben
Freut euch der Lebens
Grosse Gott (Holy God We Praise Thy Name)

- Happiness (1978) 4' For: voice, chorus(2–3 part), organ. Text: Speech delivered to educators in Chicago by Mother Teresa of Calcutta, India. First performed: December 25, 1978; Providence, R.I. Peloquin Chorale, C. Alexander Peloquin, conductor. Vocal score: G.I.A.
- A Creed for All Occasions (1978) For: cantor, chorus (SATB), brasses, timpani, organ. Commissioned by Diocese of Memphis. Parts and vocal score: G.I.A.
- Eucharist of Healing Ministry (1978) 15' For: flute, percussion, organ, double bass. Text: Roman liturgy. Commissioned by: The Mercy Hospital of Pittsburgh. Dedicated to: Karen J. Clarke. Parts: manuscript

Sanctus
Christ Has Died
Amen
Lamb of God

- In Kindness and in Truth (1978) 6' For: Voice, chorus(mixed), organ. Text: Bangor Antiphoner, 7th Century, Irish. Dedicated to: The Most Rev. Daniel P. Reilly, Bishop of Norwich, Connecticut. Vocal score: G.I.A.
- Unless You Become: A Full Children's Liturgy (1979) 45' For: voice, narrator, chorus (SATB), chorus (unison), instrumental ensemble (flute, trumpets(2), trombones(2), timpani, percussion, glockenspiel, organ, double bass). Commissioned by: National Shrine of Our Lady of Snows, Belleville, Ill. Score and Parts: G.I.A. Vocal score: G.I.A. Disc: Gregorian Institute Records, C. Alexander Peloquin, conductor.
- Lord of Life: A Liturgy (1980) 50' For: celebrant, cantor, chorus (SATB), congregation, chamber orchestra(1–0–0–0: 2–2–2–0); timp, perc(2), hp, org; str(0-0-0-1-1). Commissioned by: Terence Cardinal Cooke. First Performed: October 5, 1980; St. Patrick Cathedral, New York City. Peloquin Chorale and St. Patrick Cathedral Choir. Score and parts, vocal score and Parts(congregation): G.I.A.
- Four Indian Songs (1981) 15' For: voices, chorus (SATB), flute, trumpet, trombone, xylophone, drum, harp, double bass. Text: Native American, North American. Commissioned by: North American Liturgy Resources. First performed: March 19, 1981; Phoenix, Arizona. Bach and Madrigal Society; All Saints Children's Choir; Southwest Brass Quintet; Desert Dance Theater. Score and parts, vocal score and disc: North American Liturgy Resources.

Medicine Song(Geronimo)
Morning Song
Wedding Song
Eskimo Song (Iglulik)

- Mother (1980) 15' For: Soprano, tenor, chorus, orchestra(1–1–1–1; 4–3–2–1; timp; str). Text: Pope John Paul II. Commissioned by: Assumption College on the occasion of its 75th anniversary. First performed: March 23, 1980: Worcester, Massachusetts. Peloquin Chorale; Boston College University Chorale; National Philharmonia of Boston, C. Alexander Peloquin, conductor. Score, parts and vocal score: ms.

Her Amazement at Her Only Child
John Beseeches Her
Embraced by New Time

- Gaelic Blessing For: chorus(SATB), harp or piano. Text: Irish, traditional. First Performed: Warren, Rhode Island. Vocal score: ms.
- Love Song from the Common Mass of the Virgin Mary For: chorus(SSA), congregation, chamber orchestra(1–1–0–0; 0–3–2–0; timp;hp;org;str(0-0-0-0-2-1). Vocal score: Summy-Birchard
