= Graham Clark (footballer) =

Scottish footballer

Personal information
- Full name: Graham John Clark
- Date of birth: 20 January 1961
- Place of birth: Aberdeen, Scotland
- Height: 5 ft 11 in (1.80 m)
- Position: Midfielder

Youth career
- –: Sheffield United

Senior career*
Years	Team	Apps	(Gls)
1978–1979	Sheffield United	0	(0)
1979–1980	Darlington	6	(0)
1980–1982	Montrose	41	(0)
- * Club domestic league appearances and goals

Graham John Clark (born 20 January 1961) is a Scottish former footballer who made six appearances in the English Football League for Darlington and 41 in the Scottish League for Montrose. A midfielder, Clark began his career with Sheffield United without playing for them in the League. He represented Scotland at schoolboy international level.
