= James E. Moore Jr. =

American classical composer

James Edward Moore Jr. (April 27, 1951 – August 14, 2022) was an American Black Catholic composer, singer and music pedagogue from LaCrosse, Virginia. His 1983 composition, the Communion hymn and psalm "Taste and See", is frequently sung in churches worldwide.

== Career ==
Moore was professor of music and liturgy at the seminary Athenaeum of Ohio between 1977 and 1982, and music director of the Chor der Alten Burse in Vienna, Austria, from 1984 to 1987.

Since 1984, he lived in Vienna, where he gave private lessons in singing and conducting. He died on August 14, 2022.

== Famous compositions ==
- "Taste and See", 1983
- "Touch Somebody's Life", 1983
- "I Will Be With You", 1983
- "An Irish Blessing" ("May the road rise to meet you"), 1987
- "Do You Know Me?", 1987, for Gustav Schörghofer
- "Let us go to the house of our Lord", 1992
- "Sing to the glory of God", 2001
- "Come to the feast", 2002
- "Be still", 2002
- "Litany of thanksgiving", 2002
- "Spirit of God", 2002
- "I am special", 2002
- "Love endures", 2002
- "Welcome in", 2002
- "Alive!", 2002
- "Praise ye the Lord", 2002
