= Lucien Deiss =

French priest and composer (1921–2007)

The Reverend Lucien Deiss CsSp
- Born: 2 September 1921; Eschbach, France
- Died: 9 October 2007 (aged 86); Bicêtre Hospital, Le Kremlin-Bicêtre, France
- Occupations: Priest, professor, composer

Lucien Deiss, CSSp (2 September 1921 – 9 October 2007) was a French Catholic priest, biblical scholar, and liturgical composer. He was a member of the Congregation of the Holy Spirit.

== Biography ==
Deiss entered the Congregation of the Holy Ghost in 1942, and was ordained a priest in 1943, both during World War II. He also studied at the Pontifical Institute of Sacred Music in Rome. Passionate about the Bible and liturgy, for a year he was professor of Holy Scripture at the newly established major seminary of Brazzaville, Congo. Returning to France for health reasons in 1948, he spent decades as a professor and a retiree at the seminary of Chevilly-Larue, which later renamed its library in his honor.

Deiss composed over 400 pieces of liturgical music, many inspired by Gregorian chant and Renaissance polyphony with biblical texts. He once described the impetus for his composing career, starting at a small suburban parish in the 1950s: "I realized that the people knew almost nothing of the Bible, so I decided to try using music to help them memorize the more important texts."

Beyond France, some of his works were widely translated and sold over 5 million copies. His Biblical Hymns and Psalms (1965) was one of the first major collections of new music for English-language Masses, responding to the liturgical reforms of the Second Vatican Council in which he participated, and earning him an honorary Doctorate in Sacred Music from his congregation's Duquesne University. The National Association of Pastoral Musicians named him "Pastoral Musician of the Year" for United States Catholics in 1992. He received a Grand Prix de l'Académie Charles Cros for the 2005 album Ave Maria that he recorded with his Chevilly seminary choir.

== Works ==
=== Musical compositions ===
Italian:

- Donaci, Signor, un cuore nuovo
- Popolo regale
- Terra tutta, da' lode a Dio
- Un solo Signore
- Alleluia, la tua parola

French:

- Souviens-toi de Jésus-Christ
- L'Esprit de Dieu
- Terre entière chante ta joie
- Un seul Seigneur
- Peuple de prêtres, peuple de rois
- Dieu Regne

English:

- "All the Earth, Proclaim the Lord"
- "Grant to Us, O Lord"
- "Keep in Mind"
- "My Shepherd Is the Lord"
- "My Soul Is Longing for Your Peace"
- "With a Joyful Heart"

=== Books ===
- Synopse de Matthieu, Marc et Luc, avec les Paralleles de Jean. Desclée de Brouwer, 1963.
- Biblical Hymns and Psalms. Multiple volumes and publishers, starting 1965.
- Come, Lord Jesus: Biblical Prayers with Psalms and Scripture Readings. World Library Publications, 1981.
- La messe: sa célébration expliquée. Desclée de Brouwer, 1989.
- Joseph, Marie, Jésus. Editions Saint Paul, 1997.
- La Prière chrétienne des psaumes. Desclée de Brouwer, 2001.
