= Carey Landry =

American songwriter

Carey Landry (born 1944) is an American composer of Catholic liturgical music. Among his compositions are "Abba, Father", "Hail Mary, Gentle Woman", "Only a Shadow", and a musical accompaniment to the traditional verses "Peace Is Flowing Like a River". He and his wife, Carol Jean Kinghorn, have released several albums and collections of music through their publisher, Oregon Catholic Press. He has a master's degree in theology from The Catholic University of America and lives in Indianapolis, Indiana.

== Ecclesiastical career ==
Carey Landry was ordained a Catholic priest for the Diocese of Lafayette in Louisiana in 1971. In 1976, he was serving as campus minister of Louisiana State University at Eunice, had produced six collections of original songs, and was a frequent speaker and performer at conferences for Catholic youth ministry and church musicians. By 1980 he was devoting himself to full-time music ministry. In 1985 he was reported as having been released from priestly ministry.
