= Fred Kaan =

Dutch-British Congregational Church minister and hymnwriter (1929–2009)

- Born: 27 July 1929; Haarlem, Netherlands
- Died: 4 October 2009 (aged 80); Penrith, Cumbria
- Occupation(s): United Reformed Church minister; Council for World Mission
- Known for: hymnwriter

The Reverend Dr Frederik Hermanus Kaan (27 July 1929 – 4 October 2009) was a clergyman of Dutch origin who served in the Congregational Church in Britain (subsequently part of the United Reformed Church) and a prodigious hymnwriter.

== Early life ==
Kaan was born in Haarlem, Netherlands, and his teenage years coincided with the Nazi occupation. His parents were committed anti-Nazis who were active in the Dutch Resistance; guns and fugitives were hidden in the family home. The family were affected by the Nazi induced famine in early 1945, when three of Kaan's grandparents died.

His experiences of wartime Netherlands had a lasting effect upon Kaan. His Christianity had previously been nominal; he had not entered a church until his late teens, despite his baptism in the Grote Kerk, Haarlem. He became a pacifist, attended church and was confirmed in 1947; subsequently, he studied theology and psychology at Utrecht University.

== Ministry ==
Kaan had become a pen-friend of an English Congregationalist and through this contact was attracted to the denomination. In 1952 he commenced studies at Western College, Bristol, and in 1955 he was ordained as a Congregational minister and took up his first pastorate at the Windsor Road Congregational Church in Barry, south Wales. In 1963, he was called to Pilgrim Church in Plymouth, where the congregation were particularly responsive to his writing talents.

In 1968, Kaan was sent to Geneva as minister-secretary of the International Congregational Council, to help unite it with the Presbyterian Alliance to form the World Alliance of Reformed Churches. With the Alliance until 1978, his work centred on issues of human rights, inter-church relations, and communications, editing the Alliance's journal and co-producing the multilingual radio programme Intervox.

During this time, Kaan served as chairman of the Council for World Mission, an offshoot of the overseas missionary work of the British Congregational churches. He claimed to have visited faith communities in 83 countries. He also gained an honorary Th.D. from Debrecen Theological Academy (Hungary) and a Ph.D. from Geneva Theological College.

The nomadic life-style did not suit Kaan, however, and, wanting to be closer to people, he became Moderator of the West Midlands province of the United Reformed Church (URC), a post he held for seven years. This was followed in 1985 by a local Anglican, Baptist, Methodist and URC team ministry in Swindon; his final ministry.

Kaan's formal ministry ended in 1989, but he continued work with a four-year term as honorary secretary of the Churches' Human Rights Forum in Britain and Ireland. His hymnwriting also continued.

== Hymn writing ==
Kaan managed a significant literary productivity despite his pastoral commitments: including six collections of hymns, with translations into over fifteen languages. Kaan said that he wrote his first hymn when aged 34. During his pastorate in Plymouth, the first edition of Pilgrim Praise was published in 1968, going into second and third editions in 1972 and 1975. Paul Oestreicher commissioned a hymn for Remembrance Sunday, sung for the first time in Coventry Cathedral, but (in Oestreicher's opinion), freeing it of its anachronistic nationalist theology; Kaan's "For the Healing of the Nations" inspired the title of his biography by Gillian Warson.

In retirement, Kaan worked with the Norwegian composer Knut Nystedt to create a number of works, and with Canadian Ron Klusmeier, who composed over a hundred tunes for Kaan texts. He was made a Fellow of the Hymn Society in the United States and Canada in 2001, and in 2002 was awarded the Chancellor's gold medal by the Potchefstroom University in South Africa.

== Private life ==
In 1954, Kaan married Elisabeth ("Elly") Steller, a daughter of German and Dutch missionary parents in Indonesia, and had three children, Martin, Peter and Alison. They separated in 1989, a painful experience that led him to end his formal pastoral ministry. Elly died in 1993, and Kaan married Anthea Cooke, a doctor in general practice in Birmingham. When Anthea retired, the couple moved to the Lake District, but Kaan continued to work as a speaker, preacher and writer.

Fred Kaan died in Penrith on 4 October 2009, having suffered from Alzheimer's disease and cancer in his last years.

The Rev Roberta Rominger, general secretary of the United Reformed Church, said: "We thank God for the gift to us of Fred Kaan, whose passion for peace and justice, ecumenical drive and ability to enable the Church to sing the faith in plain but moving speech have had a major influence on the Church in the last half of the twentieth century."
