= Graham Clarke (footballer) =

English footballer (1935–2010)

Personal information
- Full name: Graham Peter Clarke
- Date of birth: 11 August 1935
- Place of birth: Nottingham, England
- Date of death: 27 April 2010 (aged 74)
- Place of death: Southampton, England
- Height: 5 ft 4 in (1.63 m)
- Position: Full-back

Youth career
- Nottingham Boys

Senior career*
Years	Team	Apps	(Gls)
1953–1959	Southampton	3	(0)
1959–1961	Ashford Town	56	(1)
1961–1963	Heanor Town		
1963–1966	Arnold St Mary's		
1966–19??	Totton		

International career
1951–1953	England youth		
- * Club domestic league appearances and goals

Graham Peter Clarke (11 August 1935 – 27 April 2010) was an English professional footballer who played as a full-back for Southampton in the 1950s.

== Football career ==
Clarke was born in Nottingham, where he made a name for himself playing for Nottingham District as a wing-half. At 16, he was capped for England in the 1951 youth internationals going on to captain the side twice in the following season.

Despite his father's wishes that he should continue his apprenticeship as a motor mechanic, Clarke signed for Southampton as a part-time professional in 1953. He made his debut for the reserve team on 26 December 1955, replacing former England international Bill Ellerington, playing at right-back against Watford. By the start of the 1957–58 season, Clarke was a regular in the reserves and on 19 October 1957 he made his first team debut, becoming the fourth right-back in as many games with first-choice Len Wilkins out with a broken wrist. Despite the "Saints" holding Shrewsbury Town to a 2–2 draw, Clarke was replaced by John Page for the next match.

The form of Wilkins and then Ron Davies at right-back restricted Clarke to two further first-team appearances, against Colchester United on 1 May 1958 and at Rochdale on 4 April 1959. He was released in the summer of 1959 into non-league football.

== Later career ==
Clarke returned to Nottingham to live, taking up employment with the Raleigh Bicycle Company before moving back to Southampton where he worked for the General Post Office.

== Death and family ==
Clarke died in Southampton on 27 April 2010, survived by his wife, Phyllis, and three children.
