= Liturgical music =

Music that was part of a religious ceremony

Liturgical music originated as a part of religious ceremony, and includes a number of traditions, both ancient and modern. Liturgical music is well known as a part of Catholic Mass, the Anglican Holy Communion service (or Eucharist) and Evensong, the Lutheran Divine Service, the Orthodox liturgy, and other Christian services, including the Divine Office.

The qualities that create the distinctive character of liturgical music are based on the notion that liturgical music is conceived and composed according to the norms and needs of the various historic liturgies of particular denominations.

== Roman Catholic church music ==
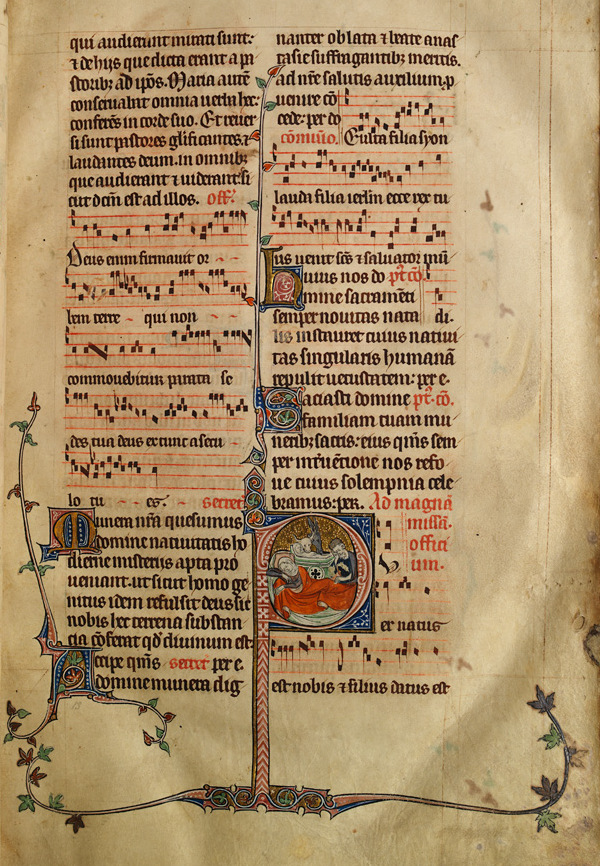
Musical notation in a 14th-century English Missal

The interest taken by the Catholic Church in music is shown not only by practitioners, but also by numerous enactments and regulations calculated to foster music worthy of Divine service. Contemporary Catholic official church policy is expressed in the documents of the Second Vatican Council Sacrosanctum Concilium, the Constitution on the Sacred Liturgy promulgated by Pope Paul VI on December 4, 1963 (items 112–121); and most particularly Musicam sacram, the Instruction on Music In The Liturgy from the Sacred Congregation for Rites, on March 5, 1967.

While there have been historic disputes within the church where elaborate music has been under criticism, there are many period works by Orlandus de Lassus, Allegri, Vittoria, where the most elaborate means of expression are employed in liturgical music, but which, nevertheless, are spontaneous outpourings of adoring hearts (cf. contrapuntal or polyphonic music). Besides plain chant and the polyphonic style, the Catholic Church also permits homophonic or figured compositions with or without instrumental accompaniment, written either in ecclesiastical modes, or the modern major or minor keys. Gregorian chant is warmly recommended by the Catholic Church, as both polyphonic music and modern unison music for the assembly.

Prior to the Second Vatican Council, according to the motu proprio of Pius X (November 22, 1903), the following were the general guiding principles of the Church: "Sacred music should possess, in the highest degree, the qualities proper to the liturgy, or more precisely, sanctity and purity of form from which its other character of universality spontaneously springs. It must be holy, and must therefore exclude all profanity, not only from itself but also from the manner in which it is presented by those who execute it. It must be true art, for otherwise it cannot exercise on the minds of the hearers that influence which the Church meditates when she welcomes into her liturgy the art of music. But it must also be universal, in the sense that, while every nation is permitted to admit into its ecclesiastical compositions those special forms which may be said to constitute its native music, still these forms must be subordinated in such a manner to the general characteristics of sacred music, that no one of any nation may receive an impression other than good on hearing them." This was expanded upon by Pope Pius XII in his motu proprio Musicae sacrae.

In 1963, the Constitution on the Sacred Liturgy (Sacrosanctum Concilium) of the Second Vatican Council directed that "bishops and other pastors of souls must be at pains to ensure that, whenever the sacred action is to be celebrated with song, the whole body of the faithful may be able to contribute that active participation which is rightly theirs, as laid down in Art. 28 and 30", which articles say: "To promote active participation, the people should be encouraged to take part by means of acclamations, responses, psalmody, antiphons, and songs". Full and active participation of the people is a recurring theme in the Vatican II document. To achieve this fulsome congregational participation, great restraint in introducing new hymns has proven most helpful.

== Anglican church music ==
While music is important within many types of Anglican service, it forms a prominent part of choral Mattins and Evensong.

== See also ==
- Christian liturgy
- Ephrem the Syrian
- Contemporary Catholic liturgical music
- Church music
- Christian music
- Religious music
