= Glory and Praise =

Glory and Praise are post-Vatican II Hymnals from the United States Catholic Church, largely comprising the music of the St. Louis Jesuits. The book was published by North American Liturgy Resources (NALR) and the contents were later purchased by the Oregon Catholic Press.
