= Musicam sacram =

Sacred music of the Roman Catholic Church

Musicam sacram is the title of an instruction on Roman Catholic sacred music issued by the Sacred Congregation of Rites on 5 March 1967 in conjunction with the Second Vatican Council. The instruction deals with the form and nature of worship music within the framework of Sacrosanctum concilium. According to the document, it is not a collection of "all the legislation on sacred music; it only establishes the principal norms which seem to be more necessary for our own day."
