= Bernadette Farrell =

British hymnographer and composer

Bernadette Farrell (born 26 March 1957) is a British hymnographer and composer of Catholic liturgical music. Among her compositions are "Christ, Be Our Light,” "Restless Is The Heart," "God, Beyond All Names" and "O God, You Search Me."

== Biography ==
Raised in West Yorkshire, Farrell studied at King's College London, and the Guildhall School of Music. Her first commission was from Liverpool Metropolitan Cathedral for the National Pastoral Congress of 1980.

She released five collaborative collections with the St Thomas More Group from 1985, and seven solo collections from 1990. Her work is published by Oregon Catholic Press.

A founding member of the St Thomas More Group, CHIME and the Music in Worship Foundation, she served on the Roman Catholic Bishops Liturgical Commission for many years. On the staff at Allen Hall Seminary from 1980 to 1986, her work in adult education encouraged the formation of lay liturgical ministries. She has been an adviser to two dioceses and a worship leader for organisations such as the Retreat Association and the Baptist Assembly. She is patron of the National Network of Pastoral Musicians (NNPM), and serves on the board of the Pratt Green Trust.

For three decades, Farrell worked in London's East End, as an Advisor to Bishop Victor Guazzelli, a sponsor of The East London Communities Organisation (TELCO) and a community organiser. One of the founding organisers of London Citizens, she built the alliance across South London and authored a report on immigration (adopted by government), leading campaigns on safety, sanctuary, housing, wages and health. She was the first deputy director of Citizens UK.

== Her music in contemporary Catholic culture ==
Writing in a variety of styles, Farrell draws inspiration from the English choral tradition as well as the melodic roots of British folk song. Her texts are based on Scripture. She also sets to music the words of other authors, including those of her husband Owen Alstott, and New Zealand writer Shirley Murray.

== Awards and accolades ==
- Faculty Award for Theology, AKC, King's College, London, 1977
- ARSCM, 1999
- UCMVA Unity Award, Choral Collection of the Year, 2003
- NPM, National Pastoral Musician of the Year Award, 2006
- London Citizens’ Founders Award for a Lifetime's Service to Civil Society, 2013
- Maybo Commendation for Outstanding Contribution to the Personal Safety of Young People, 2013
- Cranmer Award for Worship, Archbishop of Canterbury’s Lambeth Awards, 2018

== Selected publications ==
=== Music collections and recordings ===
1. Sing Of The Lord’s Goodness (1986) St Thomas More Group
2. Come To Set Us Free (1987) St Thomas More Group
3. We Are Your People (1987) St Thomas More Group
4. Holy Is God (1988) St Thomas More Group
5. Search For The Lord (1990) St Thomas More Group
6. God, Beyond All Names (1991)
7. Christ Be Our Light (1994)
8. Restless Is The Heart (2000)
9. Share The Light (2000)
10. Go Before Us (2003)
11. A Bernadette Farrell Songbook (2010)
12. Love Goes On (2013)

=== Other ===
- Celebrating One World: A Worship Resource Book on Social Justice, ed Linda Jones, Annabel Shilson-Thomas and Bernadette Farrell, Publ HarperCollins and CAFOD, 1989
- A Humane Service for Global Citizens - South London Citizens Enquiry into Service Provision by the Immigration and Nationality Directorate at Lunar House. Report Publ. 2005
- The People's Champion, 1 March 2008, The Tablet
- Housing our Future, Professor Peter Ambrose and Bernadette Farrell, December 2009, South London Citizens
- A Guide for Safe Havens, 2009, London Citizens and Maybo
- A Leaders Resource Guide for CitySafe, copyright 2011, CitizensUK
- When in our Music God is Glorified, copyright 2016, The Pratt Green Trust
