= Bob Dufford =

American Jesuit priest and composer

Robert James Dufford, SJ (born 1943) is an American Jesuit priest, a member of the St. Louis Jesuits musical group and a composer of Catholic liturgical music. One of his best-known songs is "Be Not Afraid." His work is included in such hymnals as Glory and Praise and Gather.

== Selected works ==
- "Be Not Afraid" (1975)
- "Sing to the Mountains" (1975)
- "Like a Shepherd" (1976)
- "All the Ends of the Earth" (1981)
- "St. Louis Jesuit Mass - Holy" (1973)
- "Father, Mercy"
- "Let Heaven Rejoice" (1972)
