= GIA Publications =

American sacred music publisher

- Founded: 1941
- Founder: Clifford Bennett
- Headquarters location: Chicago, Illinois
- Publication types: Sheet music; books; CDs
- Imprints: Walton Music
- Official website: www.giamusic.com

GIA Publications, Inc. is a major publisher of hymnals, other sacred music, and music education materials that is currently located in Chicago. The organization was initially the publishing arm of the Gregorian Institute of America (1941–1965); a school affiliated with the Roman Catholic Church that was initially established in Pittsburgh but operated for the majority of its history in Toledo, Ohio. The school specialized in training choral conductors in the methods of teaching choirs to sing Gregorian chant. After the school's closure following the Second Vatican Council, the publishing part of the school was sold to the Harris family.

== Gregorian Institute of America ==
The Gregorian Institute of America was originally named the Catholic Choirmasters Correspondence Course. Established in Pittsburgh, Pennsylvania in 1941, the organization was founded by Clifford Bennett as a summer institute for liturgical music. When the school oriented its focus onto Gregorian chant, the name was changed to the Gregorian Institute of Pittsburgh. In 1945 the school relocated to Toledo, Ohio and at this time its name was changed to the Gregorian Institute of America. The school remained in operation in Toledo until it closed following its 1965 Summer Institute course offerings.

== GIA Publications ==
GIA Publications was initially the publishing arm of the Gregorian Institute of America. After the school closed, the publishing part of the organization was sold to the Harris family in 1967. GIA Publications remains affiliated with the Catholic Church but is now located in Chicago. GIA acquired choral music publisher Walton Music in 2013. GIA acquired music education publisher and sacred music competitor World Library Publications in 2020. Also in 2020, GIA acquired music education publisher Meredith Music from Hal Leonard.

== Publications ==
=== Hymnals ===
Worship is a series of traditional hymnals first introduced in 1971, with about 80% of the music intended for organ. The fourth edition published in 2011 addressed changes in the English translation of the Roman Missal.

- Worship (1971)
- Worship, 2nd ed. (1975)
- Worship, 3rd ed. (1986)
- Worship, 4th ed. (2011)

Gather is a series of contemporary hymnals, with the two earliest editions intended to be used as a supplement to Worship. The second edition was expanded into a full hymnal in 1994 called Gather Comprehensive with the addition of the most popular traditional hymns and service music from Worship. Following a second edition of Gather Comprehensive in 2006, the series was collapsed into a single third edition in 2011 titled simply Gather but continuing with the mix of contemporary and traditional music from the Comprehensive volumes. A fourth edition was published in 2021.

- Gather (1988)
- Gather, 2nd ed. (1992)
- Gather Comprehensive (1994)
- Gather Comprehensive, 2nd ed. (2006)
- Gather, 3rd Ed. (2011)
- Gather, 4th Ed. (2021)

Others:

- RitualSong (1996, 2nd Ed. 2018) - a compromise between the traditional focus of Worship and the contemporary lean of Gather.
- Lead Me, Guide Me (1987, 2nd Ed. 2011) - intended for African American congregations
- Oramos Cantando/We Pray in Song (2011) - bilingual Spanish-English
- One in Faith (2014) - acquired with World Library Publications (WLP) in 2020
- Voices - contemporary hymnal acquired from WLP and previously published in three volumes
- One Lord, One Faith, One Baptism - African American ecumenical hymnal
- African American Heritage Hymnal - African American ecumenical hymnal
- Total Praise - Acquired with Meredith Music in 2020; co-published with the Sunday School Publishing Board of the National Baptist Convention
- Santo, Santo, Santo/Holy, Holy, Holy - Bilingual Spanish-English
- Sound the Bamboo - Asian hymnal
- Our Growing Years - retirement community hymnal
- Singing Our Faith - for children in kindergarten through eighth grade
- Cross Generation (2009) - for young adults

=== Missals ===
- Seasonal Missalette - published quarterly with traditional music
- We Celebrate Missal - three times a year with a balance of traditional and contemporary music
- ¡Celebremos!/Let Us Celebrate! - quarterly bilingual missal
- Word & Song - Annual missalette and hymnal with a balance of traditional and contemporary music
