= List of people with Guillain–Barré syndrome =

A number of notable people have been affected by the rare peripheral nervous system condition Guillain–Barré syndrome (GBS).

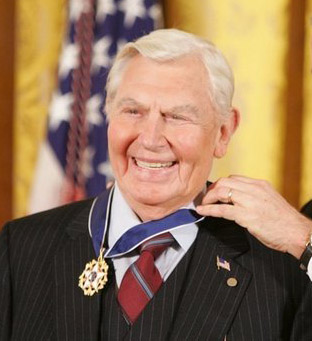
American actor Andy Griffith developed Guillain–Barré syndrome in 1983. Griffith is seen here receiving an award at the White House in 2005.

- Ryūtarō Arimura, vocalist for Japanese rock band Plastic Tree: His case was detected and treated early, and Arimura was able to return to touring within three months.
- Kim Atienza, Filipino television personality and former politician
- Markus Babbel, former international footballer, contracted GBS in 2001, following a period suffering from the Epstein–Barr virus. He lost almost an entire year of his footballing career between the two illnesses.
- Tony Benn, British politician
- Jamie Brooks, English footballer.
- Jake Burton Carpenter, founder, Burton Snowboards, Miller Fisher variant.
- Rich Ceisler, American standup comedian, became sick while performing on a cruise ship and died soon after.
- Rachel Chagall, actress, contracted GBS in 1982. In 1987, she portrayed Gabriela Brimmer, a notable disabilities activist.
- Montell Cozart, a quarterback in the Canadian Football League and USFL was diagnosed following the 2023 USFL season.
- Alastair Clarkson, Australian football coach.
- Tom Edlefsen, American tennis player, made the fourth round of Wimbledon in 1968, a year after he developed GBS.
- Mike Egener, Canadian hockey player
- Vicente Fernández, Mexican ranchera singer and actor.
- Anthony Fisher, Catholic Archbishop of Sydney
- Travis Frederick, NFL all-pro center for the Dallas Cowboys
- Rowdy Gaines, American Olympic Gold Medalist in swimming.
- Samuel Goldstein, American athlete and Paralympian
- Andy Griffith, an American actor best known for The Andy Griffith Show and Matlock, developed GBS in 1983.
- Patrik Gunnarsson, Icelandic international footballer
- Joseph Heller, author, contracted GBS in 1981. This episode in his life is recounted in the autobiographical No Laughing Matter.
- Lucia Hippolito, Brazilian journalist and political pundit.
- Christopher Cross, American singer-songwriter and guitarist was diagnosed with GBS in 2020.
- Luci Baines Johnson, daughter of President Lyndon Johnson and Lady Bird Johnson, was diagnosed and under treatment for GBS in April 2010.
- Michael Joncas, priest and composer, best known for his hymn, "On Eagle's Wings"
- Rafael Martin, Mexican-American former professional baseball player for the Washington Nationals
- Hugh McElhenny, former professional American football player with the San Francisco 49ers
- Scott McKenzie (born Philip Wallach Blondheim), American singer and songwriter most notable for "San Francisco (Be Sure to Wear Flowers in Your Hair)", died in 2012 at the age 73 from GBS.
- Sabine Moussier, Mexican actress
- Lena Nyman, Swedish actress
- Lucky Oceans, Grammy Award-winning musician with Asleep at the Wheel, was diagnosed with GBS in 2008.
- Len Pasquarelli, sports writer and analyst for ESPN and resident of the Pro Football Writers of America, was diagnosed in 2008.
- Serge Payer, Canadian-born professional hockey player; after battling and overcoming the syndrome, set up the Serge Payer Foundation to raise money for GBS research.
- William "The Refrigerator" Perry, former professional American football player with the Chicago Bears, was diagnosed with GBS in 2008.
- Fabio Pisacane, Italian footballer
- Emmanuel Rashba, theoretical physicist, for whom the Rashba effect is named
- Toni Rüttimann, bridge builder in developing countries; used his rehabilitation time in Thailand (2002) to develop software to support bridge construction.
- Norton Simon, American industrialist and philanthropist
- Kay Smith, Illinois Artist Laureate, diagnosed with GBS at age 73, able to continue painting and teaching after extensive rehabilitation
- Sufjan Stevens, American musician
- Kelly-Marie Stewart, British actress
- Óscar Tabárez, manager of the Uruguay national football team
- Hans Vonk, Dutch conductor
- Morten Wieghorst, Danish former footballer and football coach
- Danny Wuerffel, 1996 Heisman Trophy winner from the University of Florida
- Lionel Shriver, American author
- Isa Mustafa, Kosovar politician, economist, acadamic and former Prime Minister of Kosovo during the period 2014–2017

== Possible cases ==
- Franklin D. Roosevelt, the 32nd President of the United States, was stricken with a paralytic illness in 1921, at age 39. His main symptoms were fever; symmetric, ascending paralysis; facial paralysis; bowel and bladder dysfunction; numbness and hyperesthesia; and a descending pattern of recovery. He was left permanently paralyzed from the waist down. Roosevelt was diagnosed with "infantile paralysis" (paralytic polio) at the time, but his symptoms are more consistent with Guillain–Barré syndrome, which his doctors failed to consider as a diagnostic possibility. See Franklin D. Roosevelt's paralytic illness for more information.
- Alexander the Great died of an illness that started after a night of drinking 12 pints of wine. The next morning he had generalised aches, the day after sharp abdominal pain and a fever increasingly raged. Bedridden in pain, he gradually lost the ability to move, to the point, 8 days later of just flickering his eyes or twitch his hands. His cognition was not affected. The symptoms all fit with Guillain–Barré syndrome. His minimal respiratory movements may even have deceived the physicians that the now comatose king was dead when he was in fact still alive, explaining the supposed divine lack of decomposition of his body days after his death.
