= On Eagle's Wings =

Christian hymn by Michael Joncas

- Folk hymn by Michael Joncas
- Cover art of the 1979 album
- Occasion: Funeral of H. Douglas Hall
- Text: by Michael Joncas
- Language: English
- Based on: Psalm 91
- Meter: Irregular
- Composed: January 1976 – April 1976
- Publisher: Oregon Catholic Press
- Recorded: 1979
- Duration: 4:15 (original 1979 recording)

Premiere
- Date: April 27, 1976
- Location: Omaha, Nebraska, US

"On Eagle's Wings" is a Christian hymn by the Catholic priest and composer Michael Joncas. Originally composed for the funeral of a friend's father in 1976 and published in 1979, the song unexpectedly gained significant popularity in both Catholic and Protestant hymnody. It has been quoted several times by former U.S. president Joe Biden, has been performed by Michael Crawford and Lana Del Rey, and was performed at the funerals of Beau Biden and Luciano Pavarotti. While it has also been criticized for its saccharine and folksy approach to scripture, it is a popular hymn at Christian funerals. Originally written in English, it has been translated into other languages, including Italian, Spanish, and Polish.

== Composition ==
In January 1976, Jan Michael Joncas was visiting a friend, Doug Hall, who was a seminarian of the Archdiocese of Omaha studying at the Catholic University of America. Hall asked Joncas if he would compose a hymn for the funeral of his father, H. Douglas Hall, who had recently suffered a heart attack and had a poor prognosis. H. Douglas Hall died in April, and on April 27, 1976, "On Eagle's Wings" was performed for the first time at St. Robert Bellarmine Catholic Church in Omaha. In 1979, Joncas recorded and published the work, and in 1980 was ordained a priest for the Archdiocese of Saint Paul and Minneapolis. In 2014, a $5,000 plaque was anonymously donated to St. Robert Bellarmine parish, commemorating the first performance of the composition. Joncas gave the original handwritten manuscript to the Hall family.

=== Text and music ===
"On Eagle's Wings"
The first refrain of "On Eagle's Wings" from the original 1979 recording.

The hymn is based on the text of Psalm 91, with references to Exodus 19 and Matthew 13. The psalm itself contains no references to eagles, but Joncas adds the analogy of an eagle following the mention of angels from on high sent by God for protection. It is a non-rhyming, close paraphrase of the psalm with a free versification. The song requires a wide vocal range; spanning from a low A to a high E – the same range as "The Star Spangled Banner". It contains six- and seven-note leaps, as well as a leap of an entire octave jump from one eighth note to another. The tune has been described as a "lilting pop melody" with "sweet God talk", and has been criticized for its overly warm and "reformed-folk" style, with an "casual, la-dee-da" melody that allegedly casts the singer as the main character rather than God. At an awards banquet at the University of Saint Thomas, fellow composer David Haas teased Joncas for having the only hymn that begins with "yoo-hoo", playing off the opening line: "You who dwell in the shelter of the Lord".

== Usage ==
The song was used during Pope John Paul II's various visits to the United States in the 1980s, which helped it gain popularity. It soon began to be used at both Catholic and Protestant churches. It has been performed at baptisms, weddings, and funerals at Catholic, mainline Protestant, charismatic, and other denominations' communities. The popularity of the hymn surprised Joncas. The hymn remains popular among Catholic progressives but is not among conservative Catholics.

The hymn was sung by Susan Powell during a nationally telecast memorial service after the 1995 Oklahoma City bombing. Similarly, it was used at the funerals of many victims of the 9/11 terrorist attacks. It has been translated into Italian, Spanish, and Polish, among other languages. Native American Catholics have found a special connection to the song because of the eagle motif, and it is frequently sung at the United States Air Force Academy Cadet Chapel. In 1998, the tenor Michael Crawford released his album, On Eagle's Wings, on which he performs a cover of Joncas's song. An Italian version of the hymn, "Su Ali d'Aquila", was sung at Luciano Pavarotti's funeral. The song is used season 8, episode 6 of It's Always Sunny in Philadelphia.

Former American president Joe Biden has referenced the song, which was played at the 2015 funeral of his son Beau Biden, on several occasions. He quoted the hymn in his 2020 presidential election victory speech, stating that the song "captures the faith that sustains me and sustains America", and "now together, on eagle's wings, we embark on the work that God and history has called upon us to do." After the speech, Lana Del Rey posted a cover to Instagram. Joncas said he was "honored and humbled" that Biden would quote his hymn. Biden quoted it again at the National Prayer Breakfast in 2024, mistakenly referring to it as being taken from Psalm 22.

Fr. Doug Hall, whose father's death had been the stimulus for the hymn, died in 2018; Joncas performed the song at Hall's wake and funeral. Joncas has stated that he does not know whether it will be played at his own funeral.
