= On Eagle's Wings (album) =

Studio album by Michael Crawford
- Released: 1998
- Studio: Ocean Way (Nashville, Tennessee); Windmill Lane (Dublin, Ireland); Sony Music (New York, New York); Capitol (Los Angeles, California); Studio M (Saint Paul, Minnesota); Giandomenico, (Collingswood, New Jersey)
- Label: Atlantic
- Producer: John McCracken; John Vanore

Michael Crawford chronology
Favourite Love Songs (1994)	On Eagle's Wings (1998)	Michael Crawford in Concert (1998)

On Eagle's Wings is the fifth studio album by English actor and singer Michael Crawford, released in 1998 by Atlantic Records. It contains mostly Christian hymns of varying age being sung by Crawford, along with other spiritual or inspirational songs that, as written in the album's liner notes, represent Crawford's "personal exploration into his artistic roots and his search for peaceful reflection."

== Background ==
According to the liner notes, "[The album's] beginnings trace back to the days when [...] eight-year-old [...] Crawford sang Latin hymns in London's historic cathedrals as a member of his church choir. Even at that age, when no divine message will distract a young lad from his earthly pursuits, music was making an impact.

== Critical reception ==
Professional ratings
Review scores
Source	Rating
AllMusic	4/5 stars

In a review for AllMusic, Rodney Batdorf wrote that the album is "an excellent collection of spiritual and gospel songs", also stating "Everything is tied together by Crawford's gorgeous voice, which helps make On Eagle's Wings a disc to remember."

== Track listing ==
No.	Title	Writer(s)	Origin	Length
1.	"Spirit of the Living God"	Daniel Iverson	Christian hymn (1926)	3:12
2.	"Panis angelicus"	César Franck	Christian hymn (1872)	3:48
3.	"Amazing Grace"	John Newton; John Ress	Christian hymn (1779)	4:33
4.	"On Eagle's Wings"	Michael Joncas	Christian hymn (1976)	3:56
5.	"Joseph's Lullaby"	Marcy Heisler; John Kavanaugh	new song (1998)	3:48
6.	"I'll Walk with God"	Nicholas Brodszky; Paul Francis Webster	from the film The Student Prince (1954)	3:04
7.	"Not Too Far from Here"	Ty Lacy; Steve Siler	new song (1998)	4:30
8.	"Eternal Love"	Paul Sjolund	Christian hymn (1984)	4:36
9.	"The Holy City"	Frederic Weatherly; Stephen Adams; James Blackwood	Christian hymn (1892)	4:11
10.	"Ave Maria"	Charles Gounod; Johann Sebastian Bach	setting of the Latin prayer Ave Maria (1853)	3:50
11.	"Now the Day Is Over"	Sabine Baring-Gould; Joseph Barnby	Christian hymn (1865)	3:23

== Personnel ==
Adapted from the album's liner notes.

=== Musicians ===
- Michael Crawford – vocals
- Máire Brennan – additional vocals (track 3)
- Ann Marie Milazzo – backing vocals (track 7)
- St. Olaf Choir – chorus; conducted by Anton Armstrong
- American Boychoir – chorus; conducted by James Litton
- Paul Bogaev – vocal arrangement (track 7), musical assistant
- Irish Film Orchestra – orchestra; led by Alan Smale
- Aisling Drury Byrne – cello solo (track 8)
- Graham Hastings – trumpet (track 11)
- Caitriona Walsh – orchestral management
- Ron Huff – arrangement & orchestration (tracks 1, 3–10), orchestra conductor
- Conni Ellisor – arrangement & orchestration (track 2)
- Tom Mitchell – arrangement & orchestration (track 11)
- David Huntsinger – piano & synthesizers
- Bruce Dukov – violin; violin solo (track 2)
- Brian O'Brien – uilleann pipes & whistles (track 3)
- Criag Nelson – electric bass
- Steve Brewster – percussion
- Deidre Brennan – bodhrán
- Mark Zwilling – musical assistant
- Ian Adam – musical assistant

=== Technical ===
- John McCracken – producer (all tracks)
- John Vanore – producer (all tracks), engineer
- Richard King – engineer
- Terry Christian – engineer
- Ellen Fitton – engineer
- Thom Cadley – engineer
- Roy Hendrickson – engineer
- Frank Filipetti – mixing
- Mick Guzauski – mixing
- Howell Luther – assistant
- Conal Markey – assistant
- Ryan Hewitt – assistant
- Tom Mudge – assistant
- Jeff Francis – assistant
- Glenn Carty – assistant
- Brian Vibberts – assistant
- Pete Karam – assistant
- Ted Jensen – mastering
- Abby Apple – research
- Recorded at Ocean Way (Nashville, Tennessee), Windmill Lane (Dublin, Ireland), Sony Music (New York, New York), Capitol (Los Angeles, California), Studio M (Saint Paul, Minnesota), Giandomenico, (Collingswood, New Jersey)
- Mixed at Right Track (New York, New York), Barking Doctor (Mount Kisco, New York)
- Art direction & design by Richard Bates & Eric Altenburger
- Photography by Creston Funk
- Clothes by Giorgio Armani

== Charts ==
Chart performance for On Eagle's Wings
Chart (1998)	Peak position
Australian Albums (ARIA)	5
New Zealand Albums (RMNZ)	4
UK Albums (OCC)	65
US Billboard 200	57

== Certifications ==
Region	Certification	Certified units/sales
Australia (ARIA)	Platinum	70,000^{^}
^{^} Shipments figures based on certification alone.
