= List of awards and nominations received by Jonathan Pryce =

Sir Jonathan Pryce awards and nominations
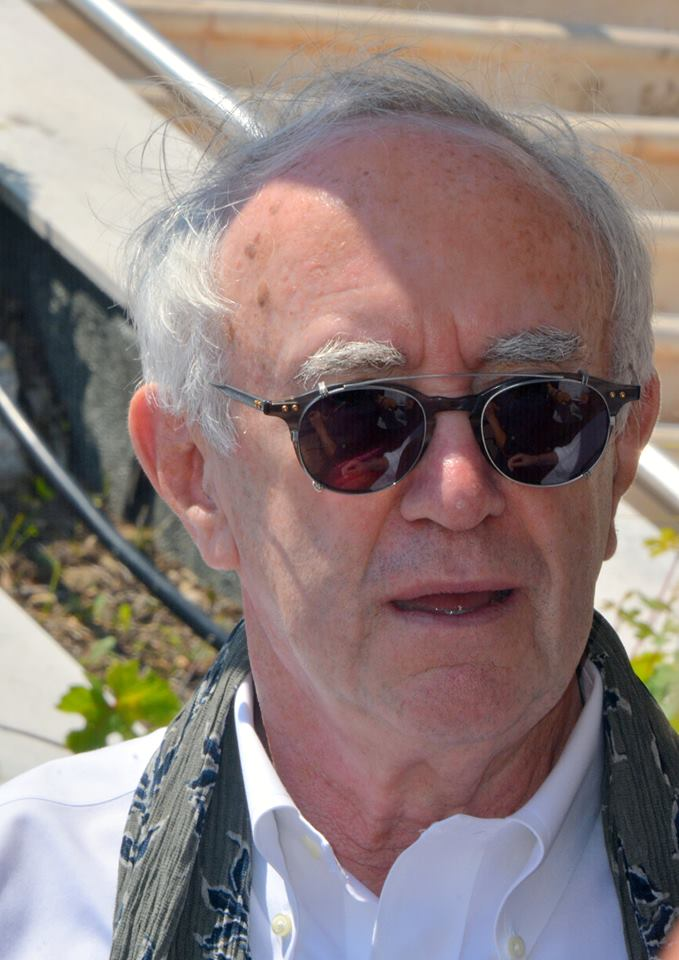
- Pryce at the Cannes Film Festival in 2018
Awards and nominations
Award	Wins	Nominations
Academy Awards	0	1
BAFTA Awards	0	3
Golden Globe Awards	0	3
Emmy Awards	0	6
SAG Awards	0	3
Olivier Awards	2	6
Tony Awards	2	2

Totals (Note: Certain award groups do not simply award one winner. They acknowledge several different recipients, have runners-up, and have third place. Since this is a specific recognition and is different from losing an award, runner-up mentions are considered wins in this award tally. For simplification and to avoid errors, each award in this list has been presumed to have had a prior nomination.)
- Wins: 11
- Nominations: 41

The following is a list of awards and nominations received by Jonathan Pryce.

Jonathan Pryce is a Welsh actor known for his character actor roles on stage and screen. He has received numerous accolades including two Laurence Olivier Awards and two Tony Awards as well as nominations for an Academy Award, three BAFTA Awards, three Golden Globe Awards, six Emmy Awards, and three Screen Actors Guild Awards. He was honored with a knighthood for services to drama in 2021.

Pryce started his career on the London stage after training at the Royal Academy of Dramatic Art. On Broadway, he acted in the Trevor Griffiths play Comedians (1977) he won the Tony Award for Best Featured Actor in a Play. He won the Laurence Olivier Award for Actor of the Year in a Revival for playing Prince Hamlet in a revival of the William Shakespeare tragedy Hamlet (1980). For his role as the engineer in the musical epic Miss Saigon, he won the Laurence Olivier Award for Best Actor in a Musical for the 1990 West End production and the Tony Award for Best Actor in a Musical for the 1991 Broadway production.

On film, he played the English literary critic and essayist Lytton Strachey in the biographical drama film Carrington (1995) for which he won the Cannes Film Festival Award for Best Actor and was nominated for the BAFTA Award for Best Actor in a Leading Role. For his role as Pope Francis in the Fernando Meirelles directed Netflix drama film The Two Popes (2019), he was nominated for the Academy Award for Best Actor, the BAFTA Award for Best Actor in a Leading Role and the Golden Globe Award for Best Actor in a Motion Picture – Drama.

On television, he played businessman Henry Kravis in the HBO film Barbarians at the Gate (1993) for which he was nominated for the Primetime Emmy Award and Golden Globe Award for Best Supporting Actor. He played a wealthy widower in the miniseries Return to Cranford (2009) for which he was nominated for a Primetime Emmy Award. He portrayed Prince Philip, Duke of Edinburgh in the Netflix historical drama series The Crown from 2022 to 2023 for which he was nominated for the Primetime Emmy Award. He currently plays a retired senior MI5 officer in the Apple TV+ drama series Slow Horses (2022–) for which he was nominated for a BAFTA Award and Primetime Emmy Award.

== Major associations ==
=== Academy Awards ===
Year	Category	Nominated work	Result	Ref.
2019	Best Actor	The Two Popes	Nominated	

=== BAFTA Awards ===
Year	Category	Nominated work	Result	Ref.
British Academy Film Awards
1995	Best Actor in a Leading Role	Carrington	Nominated	
2019	Best Actor in a Leading Role	The Two Popes	Nominated	
British Academy Television Awards
2025	Best Supporting Actor	Slow Horses	Nominated	

=== Critics' Choice Awards ===
Year	Category	Nominated work	Result	Ref.
Critics' Choice Television Awards
2015	Best Supporting Actor in a Movie/Miniseries	Wolf Hall	Nominated	

=== Emmy Awards ===
Year	Category	Nominated work	Result	Ref.
Primetime Emmy Awards
1993	Outstanding Supporting Actor in a Limited Series or Movie	Barbarians at the Gate	Nominated	
2010	Outstanding Supporting Actor in a Limited Series or Movie	Return to Cranford	Nominated	
2024	Outstanding Supporting Actor in a Drama Series	The Crown	Nominated	
2024	Outstanding Guest Actor in a Drama Series	Slow Horses	Nominated	
2026	Outstanding Guest Actor in a Drama Series	Slow Horses	Nominated	
Daytime Emmy Awards
2021	Outstanding Performer in an Animated Program	Piney: The Lonesome Pine	Nominated	

=== Golden Globe Awards ===
Year	Category	Nominated work	Result	Ref.
1994	Best Supporting Actor – Series, Miniseries or Television Film	Barbarians at the Gate	Nominated	
2020	Best Actor – Motion Picture Drama	The Two Popes	Nominated	
2023	Best Supporting Actor – Series, Miniseries or Television Film	The Crown	Nominated	

=== Olivier Awards ===
Year	Category	Nominated work	Result	Ref.
1979	Actor of the Year in a Revival	Taming of the Shrew	Nominated	
1980	Actor of the Year in a Revival	Hamlet	Won	
1990	Best Actor in a Musical	Miss Saigon	Won	
1995	Best Actor in a Musical	Oliver!	Nominated	
2002	Best Actor in a Musical	My Fair Lady	Nominated	
2005	Best Actor	The Goat, or Who is Sylvia?	Nominated	

=== Tony Awards ===
Year	Category	Nominated work	Result	Ref.
1977	Best Featured Actor in a Play	Comedians	Won	
1991	Best Actor in a Musical	Miss Saigon	Won	

=== Screen Actors Guild Award ===
Year	Category	Nominated work	Result	Ref.
2017	Outstanding Ensemble Cast in a Drama Series	Game of Thrones	Nominated	
2023	Outstanding Ensemble Cast in a Drama Series	The Crown	Nominated	
2024	Outstanding Ensemble Cast in a Drama Series	The Crown	Nominated	

== Miscellaneous associations ==
Organizations	Year	Category	Work	Result	Ref.
Blockbuster Entertainment Awards	2000	Favorite Supporting Actor – Horror	Stigmata	Nominated	
British Independent Film Awards	1998	Best Actor	Regeneration	Nominated	
Cannes Film Festival	1995	Best Actor	Carrington	Won	
Capri Hollywood International Film Festival	2018	Best Supporting Actor	The Wife	Won	
Evening Standard British Film Awards	1981	Most Promising Newcomer – Actor	—N/a	Won	
Evening Standard British Film Awards	1996	Best Actor	Carrington	Won	
Saturn Awards	1984	Best Supporting Actor	Something Wicked This Way Comes	Nominated	

== Theatre awards ==
Organizations	Year	Category	Work	Result	Ref.
Drama Desk Award	1977	Best Actor – Play	Comedians	Nominated	
Drama Desk Award	1985	Best Actor – Play	Accidental Death of an Anarchist	Nominated	
Drama Desk Award	1991	Best Actor – Musical	Miss Saigon	Won	
Drama League Award	2020	Distinguished Performance	The Height of the Storm	Nominated	

== Honorary awards ==
Organizations	Year	Award	Result	Ref.
BAFTA Award	2002	Special BAFTA	Honored	
Order of the British Empire	2009	CBE	Honored	
Capri Hollywood International Film Festival	2018	Capri Legend Award	Honored	
Order of the British Empire	2021	Knighthood	Honored	
