= What'll I Do =

1923 Irving Berlin song

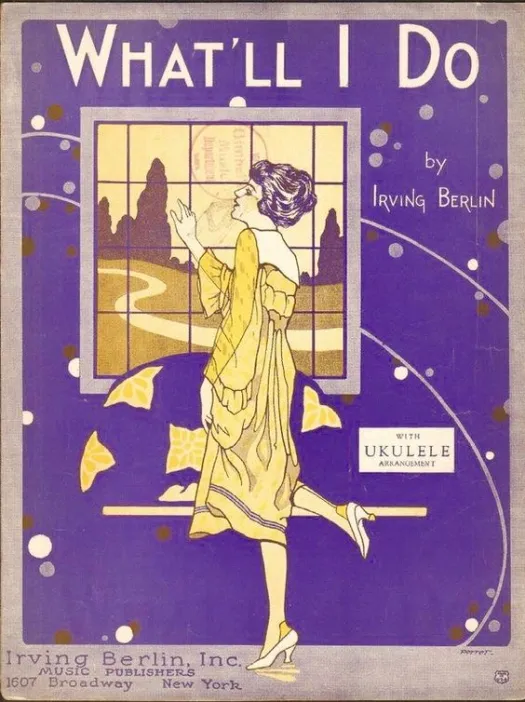
- Sheet music cover, 1923

Single by Paul Whiteman and his Orchestra
- Written: 1923
- Published: 1923 Irving Berlin Music Corp., Warner Chappell Music, Inc.
- Released: May 1924
- Recorded: March 18, 1924 take 8
- Studio: New York City
- Venue: Music Box Revue 1923
- Genre: Show tune
- Length: 2.46
- Label: Victor 19299
- Songwriter: Irving Berlin

Audio sample
- Recording of What'll I Do, performed by the Paul Whiteman Orchestra (1924): file; help

"What'll I Do" is a song written by Irving Berlin in 1923. It was introduced by singers Grace Moore and John Steel late in the run of Berlin's third Music Box Revue and was also included in the following year's edition.

== Recordings ==
- Nat King Cole recorded the song for his album Unforgettable (1952).
- Julie London recorded her version in 1955, released in 1956 on her album, Lonely Girl.
- Johnny Mathis sings the song on his 1957 album Warm.
- Frank Sinatra featured his cover of the standard on his album All Alone (1962).
- Lena Horne on her Lena on the Blue Side (1962)
- Johnny Tillotson released his version on the LP, It Keeps Right On a-Hurtin' (1962) EP and single B-side on the release of "Send Me the Pillow You Dream On".
- The Fleetwoods released their cover as a single in 1963, though it did not chart.
- The Peddlers' recording was released on a single in March 1967.
- Nancy Sinatra has a cover version on her 1967 album Sugar.
- Harry Nilsson included the song on his album of American standards, A Little Touch of Schmilsson in the Night (1973), arranged by Gordon Jenkins.
- Cher included the song on her album Dark Lady (1974).
- Chet Baker recorded his cover on his album She Was Too Good To Me (1974),
- Linda Ronstadt, with the Nelson Riddle Orchestra, featured the song on her first album of popular standards in 1983, What's New, produced by Peter Asher. Ronstadt had first attempted this and several other torch songs during experimental 1981 sessions in New York City, encouraged by producer Jerry Wexler.
- Rosemary Clooney released a version on her album Rosemary Clooney Sings the Music of Irving Berlin (1984).
- Elkie Brooks covers the song on her album Screen Gems (1984).
- Michael Crawford, with the London Symphony Orchestra, recorded a version for his album Songs from the Stage and Screen (1987).
- Tierney Sutton performs the song on the album Dancing in the Dark (2004).
- Pink Martini performs the song on the album Get Happy (2013).
- Bob Dylan covered the song for his album of standards Shadows in the Night (2015).
- The song is included on Seth MacFarlane’s fifth album, Once in a While (2019).
- Darcelle XV (with Pink Martini) released the song on their single The Rose (2022).

== In popular culture ==
- The song was used as a generalized theme in Nelson Riddle's Academy Award-winning period score for the film The Great Gatsby (1974) starring Robert Redford and Mia Farrow, sung by William Atherton.
- It was sung by Mary Steenburgen in the film The Butcher's Wife (1991).
- Bea Arthur sang it in The Golden Girls season 7 episode "Journey to the Center of Attention".
- The song was used as the theme tune to the British sitcom Birds of a Feather, performed by William Atherton and later by its lead stars Pauline Quirke and Linda Robson.
- An instrumental version of the song was used under the closing scene of "I Do, Adieu" (1987), the fifth-season finale of the sitcom Cheers.
- On the season 2 episode 6, "War and Peace", of the sitcom Northern Exposure the character Nickolai Appolanov played by Elya Baskin sang a version of the song.
- The Johnny Mathis version of the song was also used in the closing scene of "The Jet Set", the eleventh episode in the second season of Mad Men.
- Adam Hurrey performed a version of the song in the style of football supporters as part of the "Football Cliches" podcast in May 2022.
- Puddles Pity Party sings a refrain from the song as a coda to his rendition of Chris Cornell's "When I'm Down".
- Patti LuPone sings it to Elsbeth in the season three finale of Elsbeth.
