= Jonathan Pryce =

Welsh actor (born 1947)

Sir Jonathan Pryce CBE
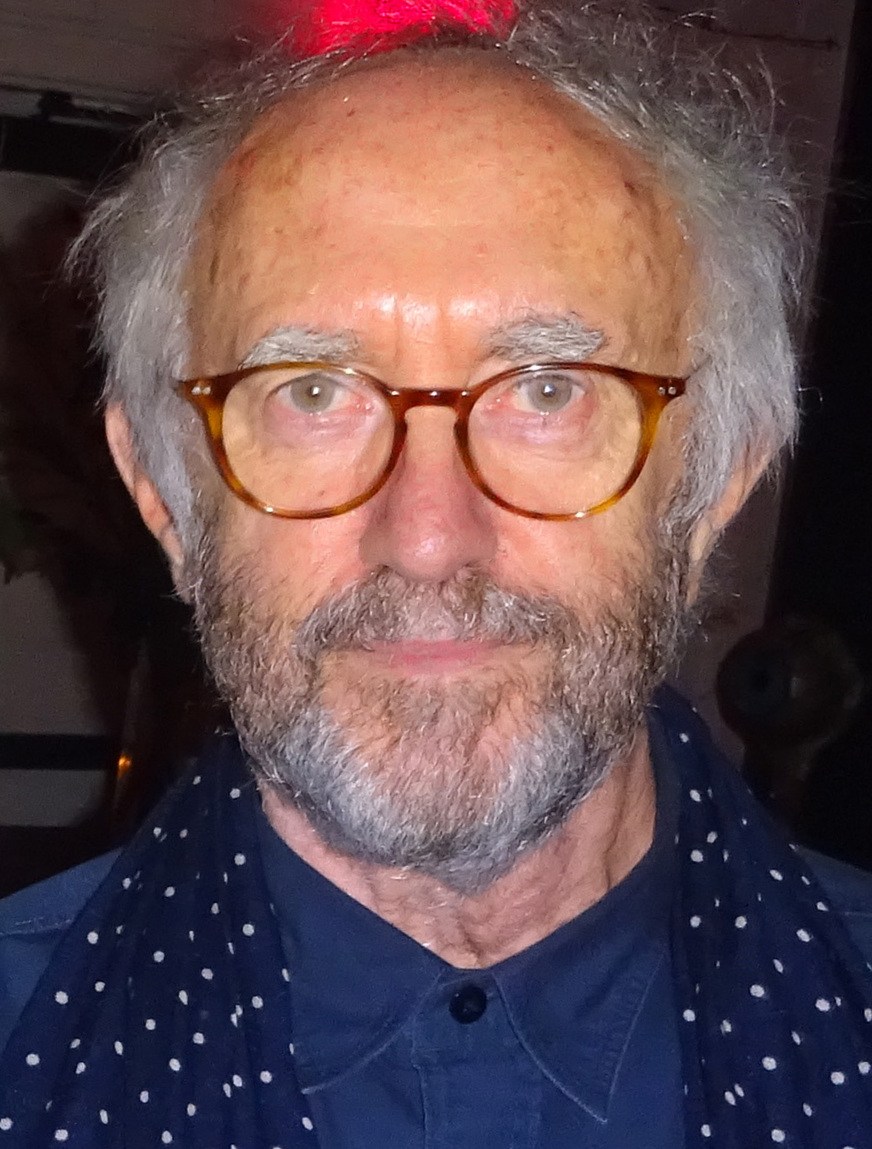
- Pryce in 2016
- Born: John Price; 1 June 1947 (age 79); Carmel, Flintshire, Wales
- Education: Royal Academy of Dramatic Art
- Occupation: Actor
- Years active: 1972–present
- Spouse: Kate Fahy (m. 2015)
- Children: 3
- Awards: Full list

Sir Jonathan Pryce (born John Price; 1 June 1947) is a Welsh actor. He is known for his performances on stage and in film and television. He has received numerous awards, including two Tony Awards and two Laurence Olivier Awards as well as nominations for an Academy Award, a Saturn Award, a Genie Award, three BAFTA Awards, three Golden Globe Awards, three Actor Awards, and six Emmy Awards. He was honoured with a knighthood for services to drama in 2021.

After studying at the Royal Academy of Dramatic Art, he began his career as a stage actor in the early 1970s. His work in theatre includes an Olivier Award–winning performance in the title role of the Royal Court Theatre's Hamlet in 1980 and as The Engineer in the stage musical Miss Saigon in 1990. On the Broadway stage he earned two Tony Awards—the first for Best Featured Actor in a Play for his Broadway debut role in Comedians (1977), the second for Best Actor in a Musical for the Broadway transfer of the musical Miss Saigon (1991).

His breakthrough screen performance was in Terry Gilliam's satirical dystopian black comedy film Brazil (1985). Critically lauded for his versatility, Pryce has appeared in big-budget films including Evita (1996), Tomorrow Never Dies (1997) and Pirates of the Caribbean series (2003–2007), as well as independent films such as Glengarry Glen Ross (1992), The Age of Innocence (1993), Carrington (1995), The New World (2005) and The Wife (2017). He earned his first Academy Award nomination for his portrayal of Pope Francis in The Two Popes (2019).

For his work on television, he received four Primetime Emmy Award nominations for his portrayals of Henry Kravis in the HBO film Barbarians at the Gate (1993), a wealthy widower in the BBC series Return to Cranford (2010), Prince Philip in the Netflix series The Crown, and as a retired senior MI5 officer in the Apple TV+ series Slow Horses. Pryce also played Thomas Wolsey in the BBC limited series Wolf Hall (2015), the High Sparrow in the HBO series Game of Thrones (2015–2016) and Sir Stuart Strange in the series Taboo (2017).

== Early life ==
Pryce was born John Price on 1 June 1947 in Carmel, Flintshire, the son of Margaret Ellen (née Williams) and Isaac Price, a former coal miner who ran a small general grocery shop with his wife. He has two older sisters and was raised a Welsh Presbyterian. He was educated at Holywell Grammar School, and at the age of 16, went to art college before he started training to be a teacher at Edge Hill College (now Edge Hill University) in Ormskirk, Lancashire. While studying, he took part in a college theatre production and applied to the Royal Academy of Dramatic Art (RADA). Pryce was subsequently awarded a scholarship to RADA, graduating in 1971, with Acting (RADA Diploma).

He joined Equity, and took "Jonathan Pryce" as his stage name because his birth name was too similar to that of a performer already represented by Equity. While at RADA, he worked as a door-to-door salesman of velvet paintings.

== Career ==
=== 1972–1984: Rise to prominence ===
Despite finding RADA "strait-laced" and being told by his tutor that he could never aspire to do more than playing villains on Z-Cars, Pryce joined the Everyman Theatre in Liverpool upon graduation and eventually became its artistic director. He performed with the Royal Shakespeare Company and the Nottingham Playhouse. To gain his Equity card, he made his first screen appearance in a minor role in "Fire & Brimstone", a 1972 episode of the science fiction drama series Doomwatch. He then starred in two television films directed by Stephen Frears: Daft as a Brush and Playthings.

After leaving Everyman, Pryce joined Sir Richard Eyre at the Nottingham Playhouse and starred in Trevor Griffiths' play Comedians, in a role specially written for him. The production moved to the Old Vic Theatre in London. Pryce reprised the role on Broadway in 1976, this time directed by Mike Nichols, and for which Pryce won the 1977 Tony Award for Best Featured Actor in a Play. It was around this time that he appeared in his first film role, playing the character Joseph Manasse in the drama Voyage of the Damned, starring Faye Dunaway. He did not, however, abandon the stage, appearing from 1978 to 1979 in the Royal Shakespeare Company's productions of The Taming of the Shrew as Petruchio, and Antony and Cleopatra as Octavius Caesar.

In 1980, his performance in the title role of Hamlet at the Royal Court Theatre won him an Olivier Award, and was acclaimed by some critics as the definitive Hamlet of his generation. That year, Pryce had a small but pivotal role as Zarniwoop in the 12th episode of the Hitchhiker's Guide to the Galaxy radio series, one that he reprised for the Quintessential Phase which was broadcast in 2005. In his original role as Zarniwoop, Pryce's character questions the "ruler of the Universe", a solipsist who has been chosen to rule arguably because of either his inherent manipulability, or immunity therefrom, on his philosophical opinions. Around the same time, in 1980, he also appeared in the film Breaking Glass. In 1983, Pryce played the role of the sinister Mr Dark in Something Wicked This Way Comes, based on the Ray Bradbury novel of the same title. Afterward, he began appearing mostly in films, such as the Ian McEwan-scripted The Ploughman's Lunch, and Martin Luther, Heretic (both also 1983).

=== 1985–2002: Established actor ===
He achieved a breakthrough with his role as the subdued protagonist Sam Lowry in the Terry Gilliam science fiction dystopian dark comedy, Brazil (1985). After Brazil, Pryce appeared in the historical thriller The Doctor and the Devils (also 1985) and then in the Gene Wilder-directed film Haunted Honeymoon (1986). During this period of his life, Pryce continued to perform on stage, and gained particular notice as the successful but self-doubting writer Trigorin in a London production of Anton Chekhov's The Seagull in late 1985. From 1986 to 1987 Pryce played the lead part in the Royal Shakespeare Company's production of Macbeth, which also starred Sinéad Cusack as Lady Macbeth. Pryce worked once again with Gilliam in The Adventures of Baron Munchausen (1988), playing "The Right Ordinary Horatio Jackson". The film was a notorious financial fiasco, with production costing more than $40 million, when the original budget was $23.5 million. The following year Pryce appeared in three of the earliest episodes of the improvisation show Whose Line Is It Anyway?, alongside Paul Merton and John Sessions, and in Uncle Vanya, again a play by Chekhov, at the Vaudeville Theatre. After a series of major dramatic roles on stage, including Vanya and Macbeth, Pryce decided he wanted to do musicals after seeing his friend Patti LuPone in the original London production of Les Misérables.

He successfully returned to the stage in 1990 originating the role of The Engineer, a Eurasian pimp, in the West End musical Miss Saigon. His performance was praised in England where he won the Olivier and Variety Club awards, but when the production transferred to Broadway the Actors' Equity Association (AEA) tried to stop Pryce from portraying The Engineer because, according to their executive secretary, "[t]he casting of a Caucasian actor made up to appear Asian is an affront to the Asian community." The London production featured Pryce in yellowface, wearing prosthetics to alter the shape of his eyes and makeup to alter the colour of his skin. The show's producer, Cameron Mackintosh, decided to cancel the $10 million New York production. Realising that its decision would result in the loss of many jobs, and after Pryce received much support from fellow actors (both Charlton Heston and John Malkovich threatened to leave the union if Pryce was not allowed to perform) the AEA decided to make a deal with Mackintosh, allowing Pryce to appear in the production. He won a Tony Award for his performance in 1991. The controversy over Pryce's casting in Miss Saigon provided playwright David Henry Hwang the inspiration for his plays Face Value and Yellow Face.

Made in the same period, Pryce starred in the ITV mini-series Selling Hitler (1991) as Gerd Heidemann. Pryce returned to the London stage the following year to star for one night only at the Royal Festival Hall for an AIDS charity alongside Elaine Paige and Lilliane Montivecchi in the 1992 revival of the Federico Fellini-inspired musical Nine. He appeared in the film Glengarry Glen Ross (1992), an adaptation of the David Mamet play. Pryce featured, alongside Kathy Burke and Minnie Driver, in the BBC serial Mr. Wroe's Virgins (1993), directed by Danny Boyle. Pryce played Henry Kravis in the HBO produced made-for-TV movie Barbarians at the Gate (1993). He was nominated for a Primetime Emmy Award and for a Golden Globe Award for his role. Also during 1993, Pryce appeared in Martin Scorsese's The Age of Innocence, and starred alongside River Phoenix and Judy Davis in the unfinished film Dark Blood, but production had to be shut down when, 11 days short of completion, Phoenix died from a drug overdose. Director George Sluizer, who owns the rights to what has been filmed, has made available some of the raw material, which features Pryce and Phoenix on a field in Utah, on his personal website. Between 1993 and 1997, Pryce, on a multimillion-dollar contract became the spokesman for the Infiniti automobile marque in a series of American television commercials, in particular for the Infiniti J30 and Infiniti Q45. In one of these advertisements Pryce appeared alongside jazz singer Nancy Wilson in a Prague nightclub. In 1994, Pryce portrayed Fagin in a revival of the musical Oliver!, and starred alongside Emma Thompson in the film Carrington (1995), which centres on a platonic relationship between gay writer Lytton Strachey and painter Dora Carrington. For his portrayal of Strachey, Pryce received the Best Actor Award at the 1995 Cannes Film Festival. His film roles during this time included Evita (1996) and Tomorrow Never Dies (1997).

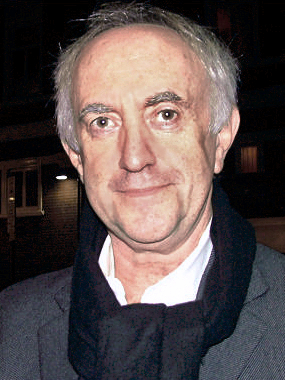
Pryce in October 2007

During the early 2000s Pryce starred and participated in a variety of movies, such as The Affair of the Necklace (2001), and Unconditional Love (2002). While the success of some of these films was variable, the 2001 London stage production of My Fair Lady and his portrayal of Professor Henry Higgins was acclaimed by observers. Martine McCutcheon, who portrayed Eliza Doolittle, was sick during much of the show's run. McCutcheon was replaced by her understudy Alexandra Jay, who would also fall sick hours before a performance, forcing her understudy, Kerry Ellis, to take the lead. On her first night, Pryce introduced Ellis to the audience before the show by saying "This will be your first Eliza, my second today and my third this week. Any member of the audience interested in playing Eliza can find applications at the door. Wednesday and Saturday matinee available." Pryce performed with four Elizas during the course of 14 months. The show was nominated for four Laurence Olivier Awards on 2001: Best Actress in a Musical for Martine McCutcheon, Outstanding Musical Production, Best Theatre Choreographer and Best Actor in a Musical for Pryce. Pryce lost to Philip Quast, and McCutcheon won in her category.

=== 2003–2013: Theatre and franchise roles ===
In April 2003 Pryce returned to the non-musical stage with A Reckoning, written by American dramatist Wesley Moore. The play co-starred Flora Montgomery and after premiering at the Soho Theatre in London was described by The Daily Telegraph as "one of the most powerful and provocative new American plays to have opened since David Mamet's Oleanna." Pryce had a role in live-action Disney Studios action-adventure film Pirates of the Caribbean: The Curse of the Black Pearl (2003), in which he portrayed a fictional Governor of Jamaica, Weatherby Swann, a film he has described as "one of those why-not movies." Pryce portrayed Governor Weatherby Swann the father of Elizabeth Swan portrayed by Keira Knightley. He reprised the role of Governor Weatherby Swann for the Pirates of the Caribbean sequels, Pirates of the Caribbean: Dead Man's Chest (2006) and Pirates of the Caribbean: At World's End (2007). Both were filmed at the same time but released a year apart.

After Pirates, Pryce appeared in several large-scale motion pictures, such as the romantic teen comedy What a Girl Wants (2003), and De-Lovely (2004), his second musical film, a chronicle of the life of songwriter Cole Porter, for which Kevin Kline and Pryce covered a Porter song called "Blow, Gabriel, Blow". The Brothers Grimm (2005), Pryce's third completed film with Terry Gilliam, starred Matt Damon and Heath Ledger, and The New World (2005), in which he had a cameo role as King James I. In 2005, Pryce was nominated for another Olivier Award in the best actor category for his role in the 2004 London production of The Goat or Who is Sylvia?, where he played Martin, a goat-lover who has to face the recriminations of his cheated-on wife, played by his real-life wife Kate Fahy. Pryce's performance was highly praised, but he lost the Olivier to Richard Griffiths.

Pryce lent his voice to the French animated film, Renaissance (2006), which he stated he wanted to do because he had never "done anything quite like it before." Pryce returned to the Broadway stage replacing John Lithgow, from January to July 2006, as Lawrence Jameson in the musical version of Dirty Rotten Scoundrels. During early 2007, the BBC serial Sherlock Holmes and the Baker Street Irregulars was first broadcast with Pryce in the lead. From September 2007 through June 2008, he returned to the theatre portraying Shelly Levene in a new West End production of David Mamet's Glengarry Glen Ross at the Apollo Theatre, London. Pryce also appeared as part of an ensemble cast in the 2008 real-time strategy video game Command & Conquer: Red Alert 3, playing the role of Marshall Robert Bingham alongside Tim Curry, J.K. Simmons, George Takei and several other veteran actors. In 2009, he played a wealthy widower in the BBC series Return to Cranford.

=== 2015–present: Resurgence and acclaim ===
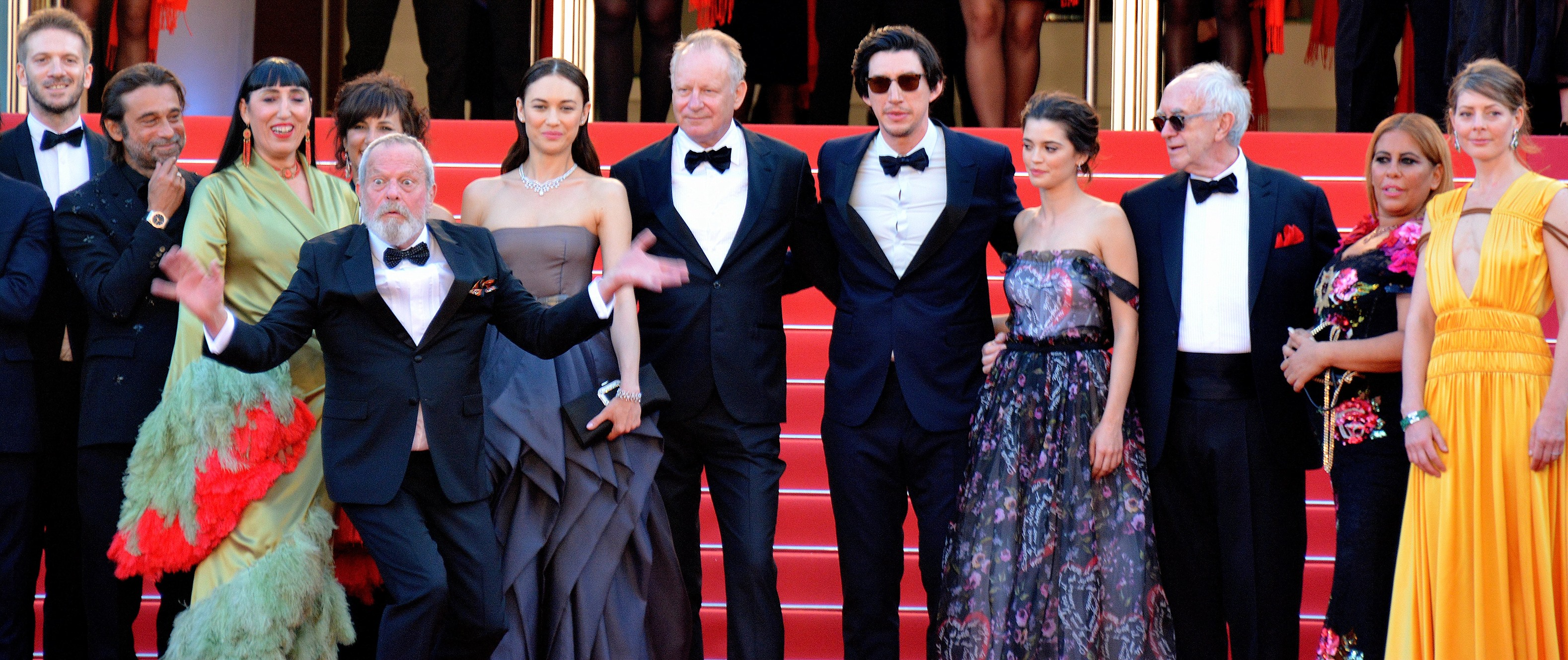
Pryce with Adam Driver, Stellan Skarsgård, and Terry Gilliam at premiere of The Man Who Killed Don Quixote at the 2018 Cannes Film Festival

In 2015, Pryce played Thomas Wolsey in the BBC limited series Wolf Hall. That same year, he joined the cast of the HBO series Game of Thrones in Season 5 as the High Sparrow. Pryce admitted that one of the main reasons he took on the role was because of how influential the character is plot-wise. While initially being quite sceptical about "sword and sorcery" shows, Pryce later had a change of heart after his positive experiences on the Thrones sets. In 2015, he also appeared at The Globe Theatre as Shylock in The Merchant of Venice. His real life daughter Phoebe played Shylock's daughter Jessica. In 2015, he joined the cast of The Healer starring with Oliver Jackson-Cohen, Camilla Luddington, and Jorge Garcia. In 2017, he starred as Sir Stuart Strange in the series Taboo, and co-starred with Glenn Close in the film The Wife. In 2018 he portrayed Don Quixote in Terry Gilliam's The Man Who Killed Don Quixote starring Adam Driver.

In 2018, Pryce starred alongside Eileen Atkins in Florian Zeller's play, The Height of the Storm at Wyndham's Theatre in the West End to rapturous reviews. The play was named best play of the year by The Guardian. The play was transferred to Broadway stage where it ran from September to November 2019 at the Samuel J. Friedman Theatre produced by the Manhattan Theatre Club with Pryce and Atkins reprising their performances. The play and the performances received a strong reception from New York critics. Marilyn Stasio of Variety praised the leading actors describing Pryce's performance as an elderly man struggling with early forms of dementia as "achingly sensitive", and like "quicksilver".

Late that same year, Pryce portrayed Pope Francis, opposite Anthony Hopkins playing Pope Benedict XVI, in the acclaimed Netflix film The Two Popes, directed by Fernando Meirelles, which was released that winter on Netflix. Meirelles cast him for his striking resemblance to the real Pope Francis. The film and their performances received critical acclaim, with Stephen Farber of The Hollywood Reporter praising their chemistry, writing in particular of Pryce, "[He] goes head-to-head against Hopkins and matches him in subtlety as well as charismatic force." He received his first ever Academy Award nomination for Best Actor for the film. In August 2020, it was announced that Pryce would portray Prince Philip, Duke of Edinburgh in the final two seasons of Netflix's The Crown. His performance in the fifth season earned him a nomination for the Golden Globe Award for Best Supporting Actor in a Television Series – Comedy/Musical or Drama. Pryce also received a nomination for the Primetime Emmy Award for Outstanding Supporting Actor in a Drama Series for his performance in the sixth season. From 2022 to 2024, he starred as a retired senior MI5 officer in the Apple TV+ series Slow Horses. In 2025 he briefly appeared as Kitty's father, Keith Eckersley, at the end of the final episode of Riot Women.

== Personal life ==
While working at the Everyman Theatre in 1972, Pryce met actress Kate Fahy; after a decades-long relationship, they married in 2015. They live in London and have three children.

Pryce was raised in the Presbyterian Church of Wales but he stopped attending service and left his religion ever since he was a teenager. He has stated in interviews that he is non-religious, despite famously portraying prominent religious figures like the High Sparrow in Game of Thrones and Pope Francis in The Two Popes. He felt a strong empathy for Pope Francis in whom Pryce portrayed, not because of formal church dogma, but because he admired the Pope's focus on global politics, environmentalism, the economy, and social justice.

In 2006, Pryce was awarded an honorary doctorate by the University of Liverpool. He is a fellow of the Royal Welsh College of Music & Drama and a Companion of the Liverpool Institute for Performing Arts (LIPA). He was appointed Commander of the Order of the British Empire (CBE) in the 2009 Birthday Honours.

Pryce was knighted in the 2021 Birthday Honours for services to drama and charity.

== Acting credits ==
=== Film ===
Year	Title	Role	Notes
1976	Voyage of the Damned	Joseph Manasse	
1980	Breaking Glass	Ken	
1981	Loophole	Taylor	
1983	Something Wicked this Way Comes	Mr. Dark	
1983	The Ploughman's Lunch	James Penfield	
1985	Brazil	Sam Lowry	
1985	The Doctor and the Devils	Robert Fallon	
1986	Haunted Honeymoon	Charles Abbot	
1986	Jumpin' Jack Flash	Jack	
1987	Man on Fire	Michael	
1988	Consuming Passions	Mr Farris	
1988	The Adventures of Baron Munchausen	Right Ordinary Horatio Jackson	
1989	The Rachel Papers	Norman	
1992	Glengarry Glen Ross	James Lingk	
1992	Freddie as F.R.O.7	Trilby	Voice
1993	Dark Blood	Harry	
1993	The Age of Innocence	Rivière	
1994	A Business Affair	Alec Bolton	
1994	A Troll in Central Park	Alan	Voice
1994	Deadly Advice	Dr. Ted Philips	
1994	Great Moments in Aviation	Duncan Stewart	
1994	Shopping	Conway	
1995	Carrington	Lytton Strachey	
1996	Evita	Colonel Juan Perón	
1997	Regeneration	Dr. William Rivers	
1997	Tomorrow Never Dies	Elliot Carver	
1998	Ronin	Seamus O'Rourke	
1999	Stigmata	Cardinal Houseman	
1999	Deceit	Mark	
2000	The Suicide Club	Bourne	
2001	Very Annie Mary	Jack Pugh	
2001	Bride of the Wind	Gustav Mahler	
2001	The Affair of the Necklace	Cardinal Louis de Rohan	
2002	Unconditional Love	Victor Fox	
2003	Pirates of the Caribbean: The Curse of the Black Pearl	Governor Weatherby Swann	
2003	What a Girl Wants	Alistair Payne	
2004	De-Lovely	Gabriel	
2005	The Brothers Grimm	General Vavarin Delatombe	
2005	The New World	King James	
2005	Brothers of the Head	Henry Couling	
2006	Pirates of the Caribbean: Dead Man's Chest	Governor Weatherby Swann	
2006	Renaissance	Paul Dellenbac	Voice; English dub
2007	Pirates of the Caribbean: At World's End	Governor Weatherby Swann	
2008	Leatherheads	CC Frazier	
2008	Bedtime Stories	Martin "Marty" Bronson	
2009	Echelon Conspiracy	Mueller	
2009	G.I. Joe: The Rise of Cobra	President of the United States	
2011	Hysteria	Dr. Robert Dalrymple	
2013	G.I. Joe: Retaliation	President of the United States/Zartan	
2014	Listen Up Philip	Ike Zimmerman	
2014	The Salvation	Mayor Keane	
2015	Woman in Gold	Chief Justice William Rehnquist	
2015	Narcopolis	Yuri Sidorov	
2015	Dough	Nat	
2016	The White King	Colonel Fitz	
2017	The Ghost and the Whale	Whale	
2017	The Healer	Raymond Heacock	
2017	The Wife	Joe Castleman	
2017	The Man Who Invented Christmas	John Dickens	
2018	The Man Who Killed Don Quixote	Don Quixote	
2019	The Two Popes	Pope Francis	
2022	Save the Cinema	Mr Morgan	
2022	All the Old Knives	Bill Compton	
2022	Scrooge: A Christmas Carol	Jacob Marley	Voice
2023	One Life	Martin Blake	
2024	William Tell	Attinghausen	
2024	The Penguin Lessons	Headmaster Buckle	
2025	The Thursday Murder Club	Stephen Best	
2026	Flavia	Dr. Kissing	
2028	Elden Ring †	TBA	Post-production

Note: The source for Pryce's filmography is taken from the British Film Institute.

=== Television ===
Year	Title	Role	Notes
1972	Doomwatch	Police Constable	1 episode
1975–1979	Play for Today	Gethin Price / Tommy	2 episodes
1976	BBC2 Playhouse	Playleader	1 episode
1976	Bill Brand	Jamie Finn	1 episode
1977	Chalk and Cheese	Dave Finn	1 episode
1980	The Day Christ Died	Herod Antipas	Television film
1980	Spine Chillers	Reader	5 episodes
1980	The caretaker	Mick	Television film
1981	Roger Doesn't Live Here Anymore	Roger Flower	6 episodes
1982	Praying Mantis	Christian Magny	
1982	Murder Is Easy	Mr. Ellsworthy	Television film
1983	Martin Luther, Heretic	Martin Luther	Television film
1987	Hotel London		Television film
1988	Tickets for the Titanic	Rev Richard Hopkins	1 episode
1988	The Storyteller	King	1 episode
1988–1989	Whose Line Is It Anyway?	Himself	6 episodes
1990	Screen Two	William Wallace	1 episode
1990	The Jim Henson Hour	King	1 episode
1991	Selling Hitler	Gerd Heidemann	Miniseries, 5 episodes
1993	Barbarians at the Gate	Henry Kravis	Television film
1993	Thicker than Water	Sam	Television film
1997	David	Saul	Television film
1999	The Curse of Fatal Death	The Master	Television short
2001	Victoria & Albert	King Leopold I of Belgium	Miniseries, 2 episodes
2002	The Wonderful World of Disney	Master Schoenmacker	1 episode
2007	Sherlock Holmes and the Baker Street Irregulars	Sherlock Holmes	Television film
2008	My Zinc Bed	Victor Quinn	Television film
2008	Clone	Dr. Victor Blenkinsop	Main role, 6 episodes
2009	Return to Cranford	Mr. Buxton	2 episodes
2014	Under Milk Wood	Mr. Pugh	Television film
2015	Wolf Hall	Cardinal Wolsey	Miniseries, 4 episodes
2015–2016	Game of Thrones	The High Sparrow	Main role, 12 episodes
2016	To Walk Invisible	Patrick Brontë	Television film
2017	Taboo	Sir Stuart Strange	Main role, 8 episodes
2018	Imagine	Cary Grant (voice)	1 episode
2020	Tales from the Loop	Russ	4 episodes
2022	Documentary Now!	Owen Teale-Griffith	1 episode
2022–2025	Slow Horses	David Cartwright	Guest role (seasons 1-3,5), main role (season 4)
2022–2023	The Crown	Prince Philip, Duke of Edinburgh	Main role (Seasons 5–6)
2024	3 Body Problem	Mike Evans	5 episodes
2024	Wolf Hall: The Mirror and the Light	Cardinal Wolsey	Miniseries
2025	Riot Women	Keith Eckersley	1 episode
2026	Under Salt Marsh	Solomon Bevan	Miniseries

Note: The source for Pryce's television appearances comes from the British Film Institute.

=== Theatre ===
Year	Title	Role	Venue
1976	Comedians	Gethin Price	Music Box Theatre, Broadway
1978–1979	Measure for Measure	Angelo	Royal Shakespeare Theatre, UK
1984	Accidental Death of an Anarchist	The Fool	Belasco Theatre, Broadway
1986–1987	Macbeth	Macbeth	Barbican, London
1988	Uncle Vanya	Astrov	Vaudeville Theatre, London
1989–1991	Miss Saigon	The Engineer	Theatre Royal, Drury Lane, London; Broadway Theatre, Broadway
1992	Nine	Guido Contini	Royal Festival Hall, London
1993	Cabaret	The Emcee	Studio cast recording
1994–1995	Oliver!	Fagin	The London Palladium, London
2001	My Fair Lady	Henry Higgins	Royal National Theatre and Theatre Royal, Drury Lane, London
2004	The Goat or Who Is Sylvia?	Martin	Almeida Theatre, London
2005–2006	Dirty Rotten Scoundrels	Lawrence Jameson	Imperial Theatre, Broadway
2007–2008	Glengarry Glen Ross	Shelley Levene	Apollo Theatre, London
2009	Dimetos	Dimetos	Donmar Warehouse, London
2010	The Caretaker	Davies	Trafalgar Studios, London
2012	King Lear	Lear	Almeida Theatre, London
2013	My Fair Lady	Henry Higgins	Kennedy Center
2016	The Merchant of Venice	Shylock	Shakespeare's Globe, UK
2018–2019	The Height of the Storm	André	Wyndham's Theatre, London; Samuel J. Friedman Theatre, Broadway

=== Video games ===
Year	Title	Role	Notes
2008	Command & Conquer: Red Alert 3	Field Marshal Robert Bingham	
