= A Touch of Music in the Night =

Studio album by Michael Crawford
- Released: 1993
- Studio: Conway Studios (Los Angeles); The Hit Factory (New York City); Abbey Road (London)
- Label: Telstar
- Producer: Arif Mardin; Joe Mardin; David Foster; Barbra Streisand

Michael Crawford chronology
Michael Crawford Performs Andrew Lloyd Webber (1991)	A Touch of Music in the Night (1993)	Favourite Love Songs (1994)

Professional ratings
Review scores
Source	Rating
AllMusic	3/5 stars

A Touch of Music in the Night is the fourth studio album by English actor and singer Michael Crawford. It was released in 1993 by Telstar Records. Like with his previous albums, A Touch of Music in the Night features Crawford singing show tunes from various musical theatre and films, but also includes covers of pop songs.

A Touch of Music in the Night reached number one in Australia and was nominated for a Grammy Award for Best Traditional Pop Vocal Album at the 1994 Grammy Awards. From the album, "The Music of the Night", a duet with Barbra Streisand, was nominated for Best Pop Performance by a Duo or Group with Vocals. "The Music of the Night" was also released as a single in the UK, reaching number 54 in the UK Singles Chart in early 1994.

== Track listing ==
No.	Title	Writer(s)	Origin	Length
1.	"The Power of Love"	Candy DeRouge; Gunther Mende; Jennifer Rush; Mary Susan Applegate	Jennifer Rush (Jennifer Rush album)	4:51
2.	"With Your Hand Upon My Heart" (with Patti LaBelle)	BA Robertson; Jeremy Lubbock; Melissa Vardey	The Happy Ending	4:02
3.	"If You Could See Me Now"	Walter Afanasieff; John Bettis	Celine Dion (Celine Dion album)	5:10
4.	"Stormy Weather"	Ted Koehler; Harold Arlen	Stormy Weather	3:59
5.	"It Goes Like It Goes"	Norman Gimbel; David Shire	Norma Rae	3:19
6.	"She Used to Be Mine"	Steve Dorff; Marty Panzer	New song	4:35
7.	"The Music of the Night" (with Barbra Streisand)	Andrew Lloyd Webber; Charles Hart; Richard Stilgoe	The Phantom of the Opera	5:37
8.	"Serenade in Blue"	Mack Gordon; Harry Warren	Orchestra Wives	3:35
9.	"Speak Low"	Ogden Nash; Kurt Weill	One Touch of Venus	3:53
10.	"Since You Stayed Here"	Peter Larson; Josh Rubins	Brownstone	3:47
11.	"One of My Best Friends"	Richard Kerr; Tim Rice	New song	3:42
12.	"Papa, Can You Hear Me?/ A Piece of Sky"	Michel Legrand; Alan Bergman; Marilyn Bergman	Yentl	6:14

== Personnel ==
Adapted from the album's liner notes.

=== Musicians ===
- Michael Crawford – lead vocals (all tracks), harmonies (track 8)
- Patti LaBelle – featured vocals (track 2)
- Barbra Streisand – featured vocals (track 7)
- London Symphony Orchestra – orchestra; arranged and conducted by Andrew Pryce Jackman (track 7)

New York & Los Angeles sessions

- Mike Baird – drums
- Chuck Berghofer – bass
- Dennis Budimir – guitar
- Angela Cappelli – soprano
- Rachele Cappelli – soprano
- Jon Clarke – oboe, tin whistle, Irish flutes, English horn, alto sax
- John Clayton – bass
- Bruce Dukov – violin
- Anton Fig – drums
- Dan Greco – dulcimer
- Richard Greene – violin
- Dan Higgins – clarinet, flute
- Tommy Johnson – tuba
- Robbie Kondor – keyboards
- Michael Landau – guitar
- Michael Lang – keyboards, additional synthesizers
- Will Lee – bass
- Charley Loper – trombone
- Joe Mardin – keyboards, additional percussion
- Frank Marocco – accordion
- Tom Morgan – harmonica
- Dean Parks – guitar
- John Patitucci – bass
- Tom Rainer – additional synthesizers
- Pat Rebillot – keyboards
- Steve Schaeffer – drums
- Neil Stubenhaus – bass

London sessions

- Gavyn Wright – concertmaster
- George Robertson – first viola
- Tony Pleeth – first cello
- Dick Morgan – oboe obligato

=== Technical ===
- Arif Mardin – producer (tracks 1–6, 8–12 ), arrangement (tracks 2, 4, 5, 8–10), basic track arrangement (tracks 3, 6, 11, 12), orchestral arrangement (track 11)
- Joe Mardin – co-producer (tracks 1, 3), arrangement (track 1), synthesizer and orchestral arrangement (track 3)
- David Foster – producer (track 7)
- Barbra Streisand – co-producer (track 7)
- Humberto Gatica – vocal recording (track 7)
- Jeff Jarratt – associate producer (track 7)
- Robbie Kondor – arrangement (track 2), programming (track 2)
- Michael Lang – basic track arrangement (tracks 6, 11)
- Michael O'Reilly – engineer (tracks 1–4, 6, 8, 9, 11, 12)
- Jack Joseph Puig – additional engineering (tracks 1, 2, 8), engineering (tracks 3–6, 9–12)
- Don Reedman – associate producer (track 7)
- Dave Reitzas – additional vocal engineering (track 7)
- Steve Skinner – arrangement (track 5)
- John Timperley – orchestra recording (track 7)
- Larry Wilcox – orchestral arrangement (track 6, 12)

== Charts ==
Chart performance for A Touch of Music in the Night
Chart (1993)	Peak position
Australian Albums (ARIA)	1
New Zealand Albums (RMNZ)	2
UK Albums (OCC)	12
US Billboard 200	39

== Certifications ==
Region	Certification	Certified units/sales
Australia (ARIA)	4× Platinum	280,000^{^}
United Kingdom (BPI)	Platinum	300,000^{^}
^{^} Shipments figures based on certification alone.
