= Charlie and Algernon =

Musical theatre show

- Playbill cover of 1980 Broadway production
- Music: Charles Strouse
- Lyrics: David Rogers
- Book: David Rogers
- Basis: Flowers for Algernon by Daniel Keyes
- Premiere: December 21, 1978: Edmonton, Canada
- Productions: 1979 West End; 1980 Broadway

Charlie and Algernon is a musical with a book and lyrics by David Rogers and music by Charles Strouse. It is based on the 1966 novel Flowers for Algernon by Daniel Keyes. It received its premiere on December 21, 1978, at The Citadel Theater, in Edmonton, Canada.

== Productions ==
On June 14, 1979, the musical opened titled Flowers for Algernon at Queen's Theatre in the West End with Michael Crawford as Charlie. In the West End staging, Michael Crawford performed one number in a spotlight while the trained white mouse ran from one of his hands to the other, by way of Crawford's shoulders and neck. The audience reaction to this was so positive that Crawford repeated it with another live mouse (while playing an entirely different character) in 2003 while starring in the West End musical The Woman in White.

The musical opened on Broadway at the Helen Hayes Theatre September 14, 1980, and closed on September 28, 1980, after 17 performances and 12 previews. Directed by Louis W. Scheeder and choreographed by Virginia Freeman, the cast featured P. J. Benjamin (Charlie) and Sandy Faison.

Charlie and Algernon was nominated for the 1981 Tony Award for Best Original Score. A London cast album was released on the Original Cast Records label.

In October 2016, Marymount Manhattan College and The York Theatre Company mounted a staged musical reading of the original "Charlie and Algernon", directed by composer Charles Strouse's spouse, Barbara Siman, and featured Ian Morel, Mia Massaro, Alex Burnette, and Brent Jones. Music direction was by Brett Kristofferson.

== Overview ==
The title characters are a developmentally challenged man and a laboratory mouse, respectively. Charlie volunteers to participate in an experimental intelligence-enhancing treatment, and his rapid progress parallels that of Algernon, who had been treated earlier. When the mouse's enhanced intelligence begins to fade, Charlie realizes he too is fated to revert to his original mental state.

== Musical numbers ==
West End (1979)

- His Name is Charlie Gordon
- I Got a Friend
- Some Bright Morning
- Our Boy Charlie
- Hey Look at Me!
- Reading
- No Surprises
- Midnight Riding
- Dream Safe With Me
- I Can't Tell You
- Now
- Charlie and Algernon
- The Maze
- Whatever Time There Is
- Charlie
- I Really Loved You

Broadway (1980)

- Have I the Right
- I Got a Friend
- Some Bright Morning
- Jelly Donuts and Chocolate Cake
- Hey Look at Me
- Reading
- No Surprises
- Midnight Riding
- Dream Safe with Me
- Not Another Day Like This
- Somebody New
- I Can't Tell You
- Now
- Charlie and Algernon
- The Maze
- Whatever Time There Is
- Everything Was Perfect
- Charlie
- I Really Loved You
- Whatever Time There Is (Reprise)
