= The Sick Children's Trust =

Charity

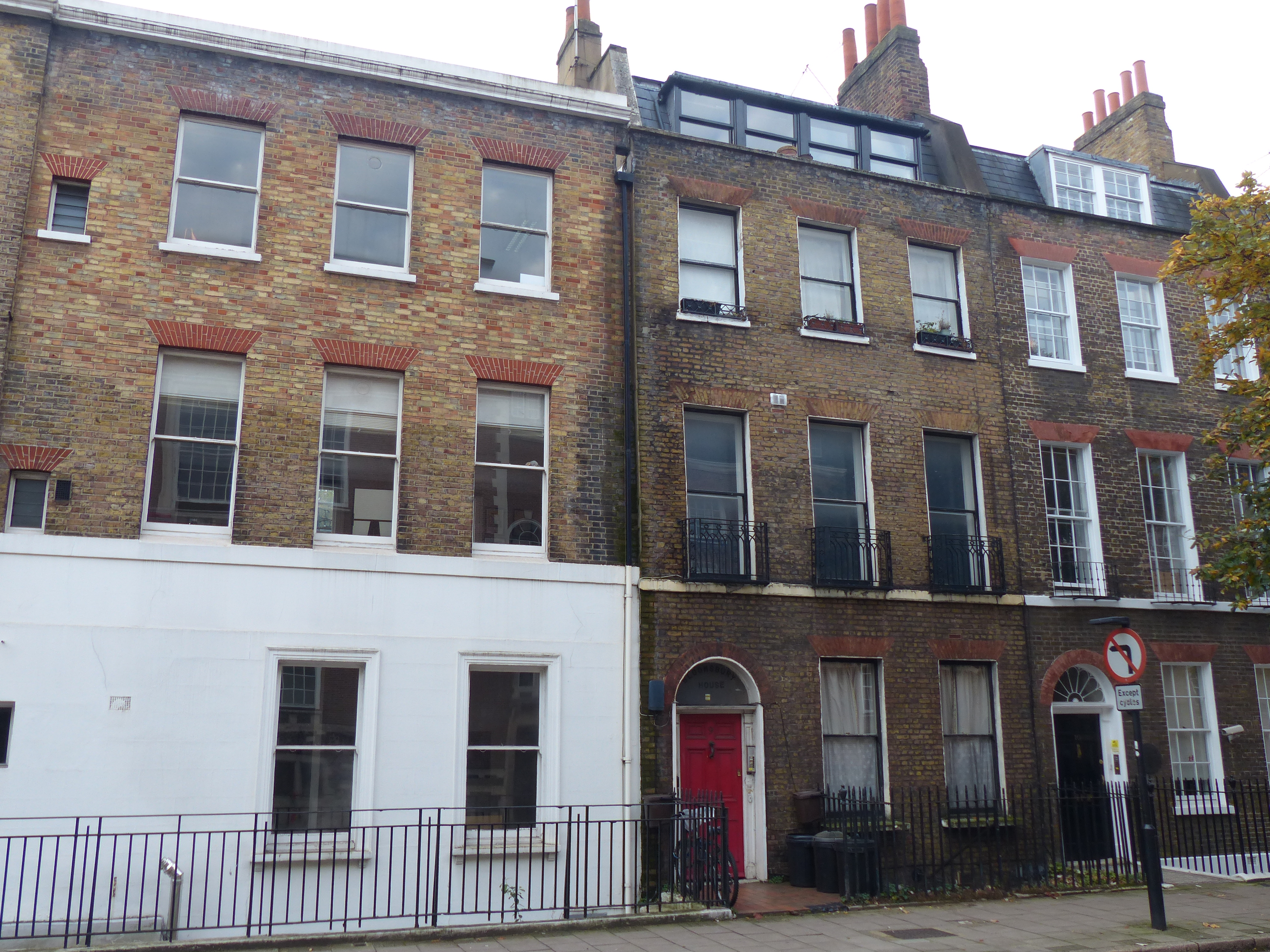
Sick Children's Trust house

The Sick Children's Trust is the charity that gives families with a sick child in hospital one less thing to worry about by giving them a place to stay and someone to talk to free of charge just minutes from their child's bedside. The charity is working towards a future in which every family with a seriously ill child in hospital can stay together close to their sick child's bedside.

The Sick Children's Trust was founded in 1982 by Dr Jon Pritchard, working at Great Ormond Street Hospital, and Professor James Malpas, from St Bart's Hospital. They saw first-hand the families who could not stay near their sick children. Some were sleeping on mattresses on the floor or in chairs, as there was nowhere for them to stay.

In 1984, The Sick Children's Trust opened its first "Home from Home", Rainbow House, in London. It has since opened another nine houses in Leeds, Cambridge, Sheffield and Newcastle upon Tyne.

On average, two million children every year require treatment and often must go to specialist hospitals far from home. Keeping families together significantly improves the recovery of seriously-ill children. The Sick Children's Trust provides families with a sick child free high-quality "Home from Home" accommodation, as well as practical and emotional support, so that families can be there for their child.

The President of The Sick Children's Trust is Michael Crawford CBE. He has been hugely active and supportive since 1987. One of the "Homes from Home", Crawford House, in Newcastle, is named in his honour.
