= With Love (Michael Crawford album) =

Studio album by Michael Crawford
- Released: 1989
- Studio: Angel Recording Studios (London)
- Label: Telstar
- Producers: Jeff Jarratt; Don Reedman

Michael Crawford chronology
Songs from the Stage and Screen (1987)	With Love (1989)	Michael Crawford Performs Andrew Lloyd Webber (1991)

With Love (titled The Phantom Unmasked in North America and Australasia) is the second studio album by English actor and singer Michael Crawford, together with the London Symphony Orchestra. It was originally released in 1989 by Telstar Records.

Continuing on a similar theme to his previous album Songs from the Stage and Screen (1987), With Love features Crawford singing show tunes from various musical theatre and films, but also includes two covers of pop songs.

== Critical reception ==
Professional ratings
Review scores
Source	Rating
AllMusic	4/5 stars

In a review for AllMusic, Steven McDonald gave With Love four stars out of five, commenting that it was "a better showing" for Crawford than his previous album Songs from the Stage and Screen. He went on to say that a "big surprise" was Art of Noise keyboardist Anne Dudley's arranging and conducting on "When I Fall in Love", "that would make [arranger and orchestrator] Nelson Riddle nod appreciatively."

== Track listing ==
No.	Title	Writer(s)	Origin	Length
1.	"I Dreamed a Dream"	Claude-Michel Schönberg; Herbert Kretzmer; (original text: Alain Boublil & Jean Marc Natel)	Les Misérables	4:27
2.	"What Are You Doing the Rest of Your Life?"	Michel Legrand; Alan Bergman; Marilyn Bergman	The Happy Ending	2:31
3.	"With You I'm Born Again" (with Barbara Dickson)	David Shire; Carol Connors	Fast Break	3:42
4.	"Every Time We Say Goodbye"	Cole Porter	Seven Lively Arts	3:30
5.	"The Story of My Life"	Neil Diamond	Headed for the Future (Neil Diamond album)	3:53
6.	"Being Alive"	Stephen Sondheim	Company	2:23
7.	"The Music of the Night"	Andrew Lloyd Webber; Charles Hart; Richard Stilgoe	The Phantom of the Opera	5:29
8.	"When I Fall in Love"	Victor Young; Edward Heyman	One Minute to Zero	3:29
9.	"If"	David Gates	Manna (Bread album)	3:01
10.	"On My Own"	Schönberg; Kretzmer; Boublil; John Caird; Trevor Nunn	Les Misérables	3:54
11.	"Why Did I Choose You"	Herbert Martin; Michael Leonard	The Yearling	2:42
12.	"Come Rain or Come Shine"	Harold Arlen; Johnny Mercer	St. Louis Woman	3:21

== Personnel ==
Adapted from the album's liner notes.

- Michael Crawford – vocals (all tracks)
- Barbara Dickson – vocals (track 3)

Production

- Anne Dudley – arranger (track 8), conductor (track 8)
- Steve Gray – arranger (tracks 4, 9, 11)
- Nick Ingman – arranger (tracks 6, 10, 12), conductor (tracks 1, 6, 10)
- Andrew Powell – arranger (track 3), conductor (track 3)
- Andrew Pryce Jackman – arranger (tracks 1, 2, 5), conductor (tracks 2, 5, 7)
- Harry Rabinowitz – conductor (tracks 4, 9, 11, 12)

== Charts ==
Chart performance for With Love / The Phantom Unmasked
Chart (1989–1992)	Peak position
Australian Albums (ARIA)	77
New Zealand Albums (RMNZ)	34
UK Albums (Official Charts)	31

== Certifications ==
Region	Certification	Certified units/sales
Australia (ARIA)	Gold	35,000^{^}
United Kingdom (BPI)	Silver	60,000^{^}
^{^} Shipments figures based on certification alone.
