= Songs from the Stage and Screen =

Studio album by Michael Crawford
- Released: 1987
- Studio: Angel Recording Studios (London)
- Label: Telstar
- Producers: Jeff Jarratt; Don Reedman

Michael Crawford chronology
Songs from the Stage and Screen (1987)	With Love / The Phantom Unmasked (1989)

Songs from the Stage and Screen is the debut studio album by English actor and singer Michael Crawford, together with the London Symphony Orchestra. It was released in 1987 by Telstar Records.

The album features Crawford singing show tunes from various musical theatre and films, and was recorded and released during his successful time playing the award-winning title role in the musical The Phantom of the Opera in London's West End.

== Critical reception ==
Professional ratings
Review scores
Source	Rating
AllMusic	2/5 stars

In a review for AllMusic, Steven McDonald opined that the combination of Crawford, the London Symphony Orchestra, and "some of the best songs ever written for stage and screen" would be expected "to produce a driving, dynamic album", but instead he described it as "wimpy and weak", and "prone to sub-Anthony Newley moments.

== Track listing ==
No.	Title	Writer(s)	Origin	Length
1.	"West Side Story Medley" ("Maria", Tonight", "Somewhere")	Leonard Bernstein; Stephen Sondheim	West Side Story	8:30
2.	"What'll I Do"	Irving Berlin	Music Box Revue	3:09
3.	"Unexpected Song"	Andrew Lloyd Webber; Don Black	Song and Dance	4:04
4.	"If I Loved You"	Richard Rodgers; Oscar Hammerstein II	Carousel	2:21
5.	"Before the Parade Passes By"	Jerry Herman	Hello, Dolly!	3:50
6.	"When You Wish Upon a Star"	Leigh Harline; Ned Washington	Pinocchio	3:41
7.	"In the Still of the Night"	Cole Porter	Rosalie	3:16
8.	"Memory"	Andrew Lloyd Webber; Trevor Nunn	Cats	4:29
9.	"Not a Day Goes By"	Sondheim	Merrily We Roll Along	5:06
10.	"Bring Him Home"	Claude-Michel Schönberg; Alain Boublil; Herbert Kretzmer	Les Misérables	4:23
11.	"You'll Never Walk Alone"	Rodgers; Hammerstein	Carousel	2:46

== Personnel ==
Adapted from the album's liner notes.

- Michael Crawford – vocals
- Adolf Fredrik Youth Choir – choral backing vocals
- Vocal Arts Choir – choral backing vocals

Production

- Jeff Jarratt – producer
- Don Reedman – producer
- Andrew Pryce Jackman – arranger, conductor
- John Timperley – engineer
- Warwick Diamond – assistant engineer
- Martin Löewenthal – librarian
- Diane Pryce Jackman – music copying
- Sue Knight – assistant to Michael Crawford
- Recorded at Angel Recording Studios, London
- Sleeve design by a.d. consultants
- Photography by Simon Fowler

== Charts ==
Chart performance for Songs from the Stage and Screen
Chart (1987–89)	Peak position
Australian Albums (ARIA)	74
New Zealand Albums (RMNZ)	3
UK Albums (Official Charts)	12
US Billboard 200	192

== Certifications ==
Region	Certification	Certified units/sales
Australia (ARIA)	Gold	35,000^{^}
United Kingdom (BPI)	Platinum	300,000^{^}
^{^} Shipments figures based on certification alone.
