= When You Wish Upon a Star =

1940 song by Leigh Harline and Ned Washington

Single by Cliff Edwards

from the album Pinocchio (Original Motion Picture Soundtrack)
- Published: 1940 by Irving Berlin, Inc.
- Released: February 9, 1940
- Recorded: 1939
- Studio: Decca
- Genre: Traditional pop
- Length: 3:17
- Label: Victor, EMI
- Composer: Leigh Harline
- Lyricist: Ned Washington

"When You Wish Upon a Star" is a song written by Leigh Harline and Ned Washington for the 1940 Disney animated film Pinocchio, based on the children's fairy tale novel The Adventures of Pinocchio by Italian author Carlo Collodi. The original version was sung by Cliff Edwards in the character of Jiminy Cricket, and is heard over the opening credits and in the final scene of the film. The recording by Cliff Edwards and Chorus was released by Victor Records as catalogue number 261546 and 26477A (in the US) and by EMI on the His Master's Voice label as catalogue number BD 821.

Edwards recorded another version in 1940 for an American Decca Records "cover version" of the score of Pinocchio, conducted by Victor Young and featuring soprano Julietta Novis and The King's Men. It was first released on a 4-record 78-RPM album set, and years later as one side of an LP, backed by selections from The Wizard of Oz. A recording with Christian Rub (with Mister Geppetto's voice), Cliff Edwards and Chorus was released by Victor Records as catalogue number 26479B (in the US) and by EMI on the His Master's Voice label as catalogue number BD 823. It won the 1940 Academy Award for Best Original Song. It was also the first Disney song to win an Oscar.

"When You Wish Upon a Star" is widely considered to be the signature song of the Walt Disney Company, and is often used as such in the production logos at the start of many Disney films since the 1980s.

== Development ==
Harline and Washington delivered "When You Wish upon a Star" to the Pinocchio story crew in early autumn 1938, and they recognized it right away as a spotlight song that should be given prominence in the film. Disney decided that the song should play over the opening credits, and used as a musical theme throughout the film.

In October, Edwards recorded the song as a "test take", because Edwards was cast as Jiminy Cricket, and at the time the cricket's role in the story was limited. When the producers decided to promote Jiminy to the narrator role, using Edwards' recording made sense as the title theme. In the film, Edwards' performance plays over the titles, and bridges into Jiminy's opening scene.

== Legacy and influence ==
The Library of Congress deemed Edwards's recording of the song "culturally, historically, or aesthetically significant" and inducted it into the National Recording Registry in 2009. The American Film Institute ranked "When You Wish Upon a Star" seventh in their 100 Greatest Songs in Film History, the highest ranked of only four Disney animated film songs to appear on the list, the others being "Someday My Prince Will Come" from Snow White and the Seven Dwarfs ranked at No. 19, "Beauty and the Beast" from Beauty and the Beast ranked at No. 62, and "Hakuna Matata" from The Lion King, ranked at No. 99.

The song reached the top five in Billboard's Record Buying Guide, a predecessor of the retail sales chart. Popular versions in 1940 were by Glenn Miller with vocal by Ray Eberle (No. 1 for five weeks), Guy Lombardo (vocal by Carmen Lombardo), Horace Heidt and Cliff Edwards. It is the oldest song to be certified by the Recording Industry Association of America. It has been recorded by many other artists since then. In more recent times, Beyoncé sang a cover of the song as part of The Disney Family Singalong. Brian Wilson has said that the melody of the Beach Boys hit song, "Surfer Girl", which has the same AABA form, is loosely based on the Dion and the Belmonts version of "When You Wish Upon a Star". Wilson later covered the song on his album In the Key of Disney.

In Japan, Sweden, Finland, Norway, and Denmark, the song has become a Christmas song, often referring to the Star of Bethlehem. The Swedish version is called "Ser du stjärnan i det blå", (lit. 'Do you see the star in the blue'), and the Danish title is "Når du ser et stjerneskud" (lit. 'When you see a shooting star'). The song features in Disney's one-hour Christmas special From All of Us to All of You, originally broadcast in 1958 in the US, but now considered a Christmas tradition in the Nordic countries, where it is broadcast each Christmas Eve. A special Christmas-themed album made for Sailor Moon exclusively in Japan featured a jazz-inspired cover of the song by Michie Tomizawa, the voice of Sailor Mars.

The song was covered by John Williams for Steven Spielberg's 1977 film Close Encounters of the Third Kind. Spielberg himself called Williams's work "When You Wish upon a Star meets science fiction".

The song was covered by Kiss bassist Gene Simmons on his self-titled 1978 solo album. "It spoke to me," he declared. "I thought Jiminy Cricket was actually talking to me! He said, When you wish upon a star, doesn't matter who you are… Yes, it's you, Gene. Gene, I'm talking to you. Go and get it – it's all yours."

In 1987, actor and singer Michael Crawford with the London Symphony Orchestra recorded a version of "When You Wish upon a Star" for his debut album Songs from the Stage and Screen. Released as a single, it reached number 97 in the UK Singles Chart.

Over the Christmas period in 2011, the finalists of The X Factor UK that year covered "When You Wish upon a Star" for the year's Christmas advertising campaign for UK department store Marks & Spencer.

=== Disney icon ===
"When You Wish Upon a Star", along with Mickey Mouse and Tinker Bell, has become an icon of the Walt Disney Company. Since 1954, Disney has used the song in the opening sequences of all the editions of the Walt Disney anthology television series. It has also been used to accompany the Disney logos – including the present-day logo – on films since the 1980s. All of the ships of the Disney Cruise Line use the first seven notes of the song's melody as their horn signals. Additionally, many productions at Disney theme parks – particularly firework shows and parades – employ the theme song.

Different arrangements of the theme were used in the Disney logo. The one used in the 1985 logo was arranged by John Debney. A different arrangement by Mark Mancina, with David Metzger as the co-arranger and orchestrator, was used for the 2006 logo, while another arrangement by Christophe Beck, with Tim Davies as the orchestrator, is used for the 2022 logo, in honor of the studio's 100th anniversary in 2023. The version used in the 2006 Disney logo is also featured in the pilot episode of Mickey Mouse Funhouse, entitled "Mickey the Brave!".

The 1991 video Simply Mad About the Mouse: A Musical Celebration of Imagination featured a recording of Billy Joel performing "When You Wish Upon a Star", accompanied by animation. This video was nominated for a Grammy Award for Best Short Form Music Video.

In December 2008, a number of prominent performers gathered for a concert called BBC Radio 2 Celebrates the Music of Disney. It was hosted by Josh Groban, who performed "When You Wish Upon a Star".

To commemorate the centennial anniversary of The Walt Disney Company, Sara Bareilles recorded a cover of the song as part of the company's "100 Years of Wonder" campaign and was released as a single on May 14, 2023 after being performed live as part of Disney Night on season 21 of American Idol.

The finale of the Walt Disney Animation Studios short film Once Upon a Studio (2023) features a cast of 543 Disney animated characters singing the song, with the original Cliff Edwards recording being utilized for Jiminy Cricket's vocals.

The first five notes of the song are featured multiple times in Dave Metzger's underscore for Walt Disney Animation Studios' feature film Wish.

=== Dion and the Belmonts ===
Released a single of the song on Laurie Records (3052) and an album Wish Upon A Star with Dion and the Belmonts (LLP2006) in 1960.

=== Earth, Wind & Fire ===
The lyrics of Earth, Wind & Fire's song Shining Star directly reference the Disney song.

=== As a jazz standard ===
The piece has become a jazz standard.

== Family Guy parody and lawsuit ==
The owner of the rights to the song, Bourne Co. Music Publishers, sued Twentieth Century Fox Film Corp., Fox Broadcasting Company, Fuzzy Door Productions, Cartoon Network, Walter Murphy and Seth MacFarlane to try to stop distribution of a 2003 Family Guy episode entitled "When You Wish Upon a Weinstein" that parodies the song in a version called "I Need a Jew". A federal judge ruled against Bourne Co, stating that a parody of the song did not infringe on the company's copyright.

== Certifications ==
Region	Certification	Certified units/sales
United States (RIAA)	Platinum	1,000,000^{‡}
^{‡} Sales+streaming figures based on certification alone.
