= Michael Crawford Performs Andrew Lloyd Webber =

Studio album by Michael Crawford
- Released: 1991
- Recorded: September 1991
- Studio: Abbey Road (London)
- Labels: Telstar; Atlantic
- Producers: Jeff Jarratt; Don Reedman

Michael Crawford chronology
With Love / The Phantom Unmasked (1989)	Michael Crawford Performs Andrew Lloyd Webber (1991)	A Touch of Music in the Night (1993)

Michael Crawford Performs Andrew Lloyd Webber is the third studio album by English actor and singer Michael Crawford, released in 1991 by Telstar Records in the United Kingdom and Atlantic Records in the rest of the world.

The album features Crawford singing show tunes from musicals created by composer and impresario Andrew Lloyd Webber along with various lyricists. Crawford had starred in Lloyd Webber's 1986 musical The Phantom of the Opera as the title character, earning Crawford both the Laurence Olivier Award for Best Actor in a Leading Role in a Musical and Tony Award for Best Actor in a Leading Role in a Musical. The album reached number one in Australia.

== Track listing ==
All music written by Andrew Lloyd Webber.

No.	Title	Lyrics	Origin	Length
1.	"Any Dream Will Do"	Tim Rice	Joseph and the Amazing Technicolor Dreamcoat	3:41
2.	"All I Ask of You" (with Barbara Bonney)	Charles Hart; Richard Stilgoe	The Phantom of the Opera	4:53
3.	"Wishing You Were Somehow Here Again"	Hart; Stilgoe	The Phantom of the Opera	3:57
4.	"And the Money Kept Rolling In (And Out)"	Rice	Evita	3:52
5.	"Nothing Like You've Ever Known"	Don Black	Tell Me on a Sunday	3:34
6.	"Tell Me on a Sunday"	Black	Tell Me on a Sunday	3:47
7.	"Gethsemane"	Rice	Jesus Christ Superstar	6:01
8.	"The Phantom of the Opera" (with Barbara Bonney)	Hart; Stilgoe; Mike Batt	The Phantom of the Opera	4:30
9.	"The Music of the Night"	Hart; Stilgoe	The Phantom of the Opera	5:51
10.	"Memory"	T. S. Eliot; Trevor Nunn	Cats	4:26
11.	"Only You" (with Frances Ruffelle)	Stilgoe	Starlight Express	4:58
12.	"Other Pleasures / The First Man You Remember" (with Lucy Crawford)	Hart; Black	Aspects of Love	4:00
13.	"Love Changes Everything"	Hart; Black	Aspects of Love	3:24

== Personnel ==
Adapted from the album's liner notes.

Musicians

- Michael Crawford – vocals (all tracks)
- Sharon Benson – additional vocals (track 13)
- Paul Bogaev – musical assistant to Michael Crawford
- Barbara Bonney – featured vocals (tracks 2, 8), additional vocals (track 13)
- Boys Choir of Harlem – additional vocals; directed by Dr. Walter J. Turnbull (tracks 7, 13)
- Lucy Crawford – featured vocals (track 12)
- David Cullen – arrangement (tracks 2, 3, 8, 9, 13)
- Michael Reed – arrangement (track 10), musical director
- Royal Philharmonic Orchestra – orchestra; led by David Towse
- Frances Ruffelle – featured vocals (track 11)
- Robin Smith – arrangement (tracks 1, 5, 11)
- Stephen Hill Singers – additional vocals (tracks 4, 7, 8, 13)
- Larry Wilcox – adaptation (tracks 3, 8), arrangement (tracks 4, 6, 7, 9, 10, 12)

Technical

- Jeff Jarratt – producer
- Mike Jarratt – engineer & remixing
- Don Reedman – producer
- Simon Rhodes – digital editing & assistant
- Recorded at Abbey Road Studios, London
- Sleeve design by The Indigo Design Company
- Photography by Simon Fowler

== Charts ==
Chart performance for Michael Crawford Performs Andrew Lloyd Webber
Chart (1991)	Peak position
Australian Albums (ARIA)	1
New Zealand Albums (RMNZ)	4
UK Albums (Official Charts)	3
US Billboard 200	54

== Certifications ==
Region	Certification	Certified units/sales
Australia (ARIA)	3× Platinum	210,000^{^}
United Kingdom (BPI)	2× Platinum	600,000^{^}
^{^} Shipments figures based on certification alone.
