= David Haas =

American author and composer

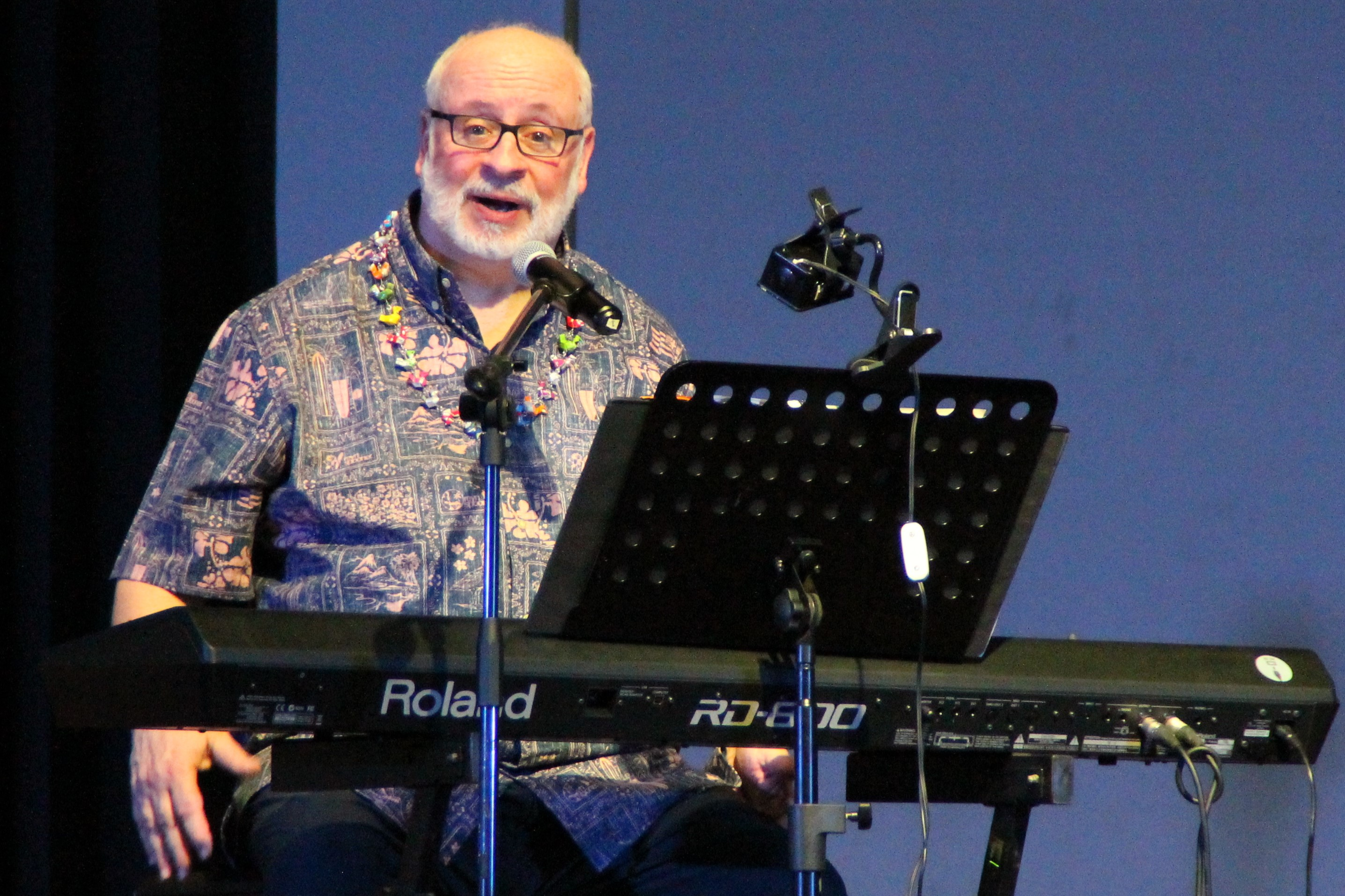
David Haas in a concert at the Ateneo de Manila University, Quezon City, Philippines

David Robert Haas (born 1957 in Bridgeport, Michigan) is an American author and composer of contemporary Catholic liturgical music. In 2020, dozens of women accused him of sexual misconduct spanning several decades, and he issued a public apology for harmful behavior. As a consequence leaders in diverse Church traditions have requested local communities to remove hymns composed by Haas from use. His hymns have been removed from subscription services and from recent editions of major hymnal collections.

== Education and career ==
Haas graduated from Bridgeport High School in 1975. He studied vocal music performance at Central Michigan University from 1975 to 1977. From 1977 to 1978, Haas served in parish and school communities in the Diocese of Saginaw. From 1978 to 1980, Haas was a seminarian for the Diocese of Saginaw, studying at Saint John Vianney College Seminary and the University of St. Thomas in St. Paul, Minnesota. From 1980 to 1981, Haas served as a pastoral musician at Church of the Blessed Sacrament in St. Paul, Minnesota. From 1981 to 1982, Haas was the Director of Music and Youth Ministry at Our Lady's Immaculate Heart Church in Ankeny, Iowa. From 1982 to 1985, Haas was Director of Music/Liturgy at St. Thomas Aquinas Catholic Church in St. Paul Park, MN. From 1985 to 1988, Haas was Composer-in-Residence/Adjunct Instructor at Saint Paul Seminary School of Divinity in St. Paul, Minnesota.

In 1991, Haas completed his B.A. in Theology and Vocal Music Performance from the University of St. Thomas in St. Paul, Minnesota. From 1991 to 1994, Haas served as Composer-in-Residence / Pastoral Musician at St. Thomas the Apostle Church in Minneapolis, Minnesota. From 1992 to 2020, Haas served as Director of The Emmaus Center for Music, Prayer and Ministry in his hometown of Eagan, Minnesota. From 1997 to 2011, Haas worked at the preparatory school Benilde-St. Margaret's in St. Louis Park, Minnesota, where he was Campus Minister and Artist-in-Residence. From 2011 to 2015, Haas served as Campus Minister at Cretin-Derham Hall High School in St. Paul, Minnesota.

He has produced over 45 original collections and recordings of liturgical music and is the author of several books on the topics of prayer and liturgical music. His music has been published in the hymnals of GIA Publications, Oregon Catholic Press, Liturgical Press, World Library Publications, Augsburg Fortress, The Canadian Conference of Catholic Bishops, The Australian Catholic Bishops' Conference, Celebrating Grace, Disciples of Christ, The Anglican Church of Canada, and others. Among his most widely known hymns are "Blest Are They", "We Are Called", and "You Are Mine". Haas has collaborated on recordings, concerts and workshops with Michael Joncas, Marty Haugen, Jeanne Cotter, Lori True, and others.

From 1999 to 2017, Haas directed the program Music Ministry Alive!, a five-day liturgical program for youth and adult leaders that met on the campus of St. Catherine University in St. Paul, Minnesota. From 1985 to 1996, Haas served as a Faculty/Team Member for Institutes with the North American Forum on the Catechumenate, helping develop liturgical and musical aspects of the Rite of Christian Initiation of Adults (RCIA). From 1986 to 2020, Haas presented at the annual Los Angeles Religious Education Congress. Haas is a member of St. Cecilia's Parish in St. Paul, where he has volunteered as a cantor.

== Personal life ==
Haas married fellow composer Jeanne Cotter in October 1988, after the relationship started when Cotter was 16 and Haas 23. Haas and Cotter divorced in March 1995, and the Archdiocese of Saint Paul and Minneapolis granted an annulment.

== Allegations of sexual misconduct ==
On May 29, 2020, advocacy group Into Account sent a letter to Catholic organizations, accusing Haas of sexual misconduct with "nearly a dozen" victims. This was subsequently reported by the Survivors Network of those Abused by Priests and Catholic News Agency. Following publication of the letter, an additional 14 women approached Into Account with allegations of sexual misconduct by Haas. Initially, he denied the allegations and denounced them as "false, reckless and offensive". Then, on July 9, 2020, Haas issued an apology on his website, announcing that he was beginning "professional intervention and treatment" and saying: "I have come to realize that I have caused great harm to a variety of people. I make no excuses for any harm that I may have caused. I take responsibility for my behavior and I am truly sorry."

On October 1, 2020, Into Account released a report detailing 44 allegations of Haas's sexual misconduct spanning 41 years. The report alleges that from 1979 to 1982 Haas "targeted girls from 13–17 for rape, forced oral sex" and "false romantic and sexual relationships" and that from 1981 to 2019 Haas targeted "girls 14–17 for grooming" and "false mentorship bonds" and targeted "young adults and women 18–60 for grooming and forced sexual acts."

Jeanne Cotter, who had been married to Haas, contributes to the report as a survivor, offering testimony (on p2) of her revulsion as a 16 year old to Haas's first assault on her. Highlighting the marked changed in Haas's modus from 1981, Cotter documents (on p5) Haas's connections around that time with serial clerical abuser, Catholic priest Robert Deland, speculating Deland may have mentored Haas on grooming and techniques to ensure impunity in abuse. A lawsuit further alleged that his Music Ministry Alive program shielded a suspended priest who had been credibly accused of child sexual abuse and prohibited from contact with minors.

=== Responses ===
==== Publishers ====
- On June 13, 2020, GIA Publications announced that it had terminated its relationship with Haas and was removing his works from its publications. On July 15, GIA announced the establishment of a code of conduct for all its composers and authors. On August 4, GIA announced that "We have identified and retained a prominent, independent law firm to conduct an internal assessment of our actions, policies, and procedures related to the allegations against David Haas."
- On June 15, 2020, Oregon Catholic Press announced that it was removing Haas' songs from its website.
- On June 17, 2020, Twenty-Third Publications announced that in response to allegations against Haas, "his works are no longer available through the Twenty-Third Publication brand."
- On June 18, 2020, Clear Faith Publishing announced that in response to allegations against Haas, "we have decided to suspend our sponsorship and promotion of his works done through our publishing company immediately."
- On June 23 and June 30, 2020, the MennoMedia publishing arm of Mennonite Church USA announced it would be removing Haas' music from the upcoming edition of the Voices Together hymnal and replacing it with other songs.
- On November 2, 2020, the Evangelical Lutheran Church in America announced that "Both the ELCA and 1517 Media / Augsburg Fortress have taken steps to discontinue suggesting hymns by Haas in worship planning resources for this church and to amend existing resources currently available online. The ELCA and 1517 Media have no plans to include his works in future resources and publications."

==== Educational institutions ====
- On June 16, 2020, Cretin-Derham Hall High School, where Haas worked from 2011–2015 and ministered at worship events until 2018, released a statement recognizing that he was under investigation for sexual misconduct, and expressing sympathy with the victims. According to the statement, Cretin-Derham Hall is not aware of any allegations involving students or employees.
- On August 4 and August 10, 2020, St. Catherine University, where Music Ministry Alive! was held, released statements offering support to anyone abused by Haas and announcing an "independent investigation of its history and relationship with Mr. Haas and the allegations against him involving Music Ministry Alive! and other campus events."
- On October 10, 2020 the Saint Paul Seminary, where Haas was Composer in Residence from 1985-1988, released a statement sharing the results of an internal investigation. The investigation found that an allegation of sexual assault of an 18-year old woman was made against Haas in October 1987, that Rector/Vice President Rev. Charles Froehle notified the Archdiocese of St. Paul and Minneapolis, and that Froehle met with the woman and her parents, and arranged for counseling for Haas.

==== Religious organizations ====
- On June 14, 2020, the Archdiocese of Saint Paul and Minneapolis confirmed that it had received similar complaints against Haas in 1987 and 2018 (which it then required him to disclose to prospective archdiocesan employers) and that he had requested a letter of recommendation (which the archdiocese refused). On July 8, the archdiocese further announced that its events would no longer allow Haas's music or presentations, and encouraged diocesan institutions "to consider the sensitivities involved with using Haas' music in liturgies or other parish or school events, and to take appropriate steps to fully support those who have been harmed by sexual assault or abuse." On October 8, the archdiocese responded to Into Account's report against Haas, which alleged that his sexual abuse of a 13-year-old in 1979 had been promptly reported to the archdiocese. Although "a review of archdiocesan records ... has not surfaced any such report", the archdiocese forwarded the allegation to law enforcement and encouraged anyone with knowledge of criminal behavior to share this information with law enforcement.
- On June 30, 2020, the Archdiocese of Los Angeles stated that it was opening an investigation into the allegations, and that it "is also reviewing GIA Publications' announcement that it is suspending its relationship with Mr. Haas as his sponsor and publisher". Haas was prohibited from performing in the Archdiocese, and on July 30 the Archdiocese asked all its parishes, schools, and ministries to refrain from using his music.
- On June 30, 2020, the Diocese of Venice in Florida stated that it would be inappropriate to continue using Haas's music at Mass.
- On July 9, 2020, the Crosier Fathers, who had previously awarded Haas their Outstanding Service in Ministry Award in 2004, issued a statement condemning abusive behavior and expressing empathy for survivors.
- On July 24, 2020, the Liturgical Composers Forum suspended Haas's membership and returned his financial contributions to As Music Heals.
- In July–November 2020, at least 84 American Catholic dioceses announced they were urging or imposing a suspension of Haas's music, out of concern for abuse victims.
- On August 21, 2020, Discipleship Ministries of the United Methodist Church requested that congregations not perform Haas's music, pending an investigation and possible court proceedings.
- In October 2020, The Archdiocese of Detroit announced that parishes throughout the Archdiocese would cut his music from their repertoire.
- On November 2, 2020, the Evangelical Lutheran Church in America strongly encouraged congregations to discontinue using works by Haas.

== Awards and recognition ==
- 1995: Distinguished Alumnus Award from the University of St. Thomas (together with Michael Joncas and Marty Haugen) — rescinded in July 2020 due to sexual misconduct allegations
- 2003: Outstanding Professional Book Award from the Catholic Press Association
- 2004: Pastoral Musician of the Year from the National Association of Pastoral Musicians — rescinded in July 2020 due to sexual misconduct allegations
- 2004: Outstanding Service in Ministry Award from the Crosier Fathers - rescinded in July 2020 due to sexual misconduct allegations
- 2014: Emmaus Award for Excellence in Catechesis from the National Catholic Education Association
- 2015: Honorary Doctor of Humane Letters from the University of Portland — rescinded in August 2020 due to sexual misconduct allegations
- 2017: Pax Christi Award from St. John's Abbey and University — rescinded in August 2020 due to sexual misconduct allegations
