= Comedians (play) =

Play by Trevor Griffiths

Comedians is a play by Trevor Griffiths, set in a Manchester evening class for aspiring working-class comedians. It was first performed at the Nottingham Playhouse on 20 February 1975, in a production directed by Richard Eyre. The cast included Jonathan Pryce as the main character, Gethin Price, Stephen Rea and the comedian and music hall performer Jimmy Jewel as the teacher. The play deals with political issues such as sexism and racism.

== Setting ==
The play is set in the bleakness of 1970s Manchester, changing scene from a school classroom to a social club and back again. Various evening classes take place in the classroom, including a stand-up comedy course taught by Eddie Waters, a retired comedian.

== Plot ==
=== Act 1 ===
The play opens in a classroom on a rainy night, where the school caretaker is cleaning graffiti off a blackboard. Gethin Price, a young man, enters and begins to shave. One by one, Phil Murray, George McBrain, Sammy Samuels and Mick Connor file into the room, as they discuss their outfits for later that night. Eddie Waters, the teacher of their stand-up comedy evening class, comes in. Eventually Ged Murray completes the class, and they swap jokes and begin to warm up. Later on, they will perform in front of Bert Challenor, the president of the Comedy Federation, who has come up from London to scout for talent. Waters takes exception to a misogynistic rhyme told by Price, and takes the opportunity to denounce sexist, racist and other such forms of comedy, explaining that they feed on ignorance and "starve the audience". Mr Patel, an Asian man, walks into the room, having mistaken this class for a different one. Waters welcomes him and allows him to stay in the room. Waters then makes the stand-ups recount a serious story from their past, creating a tense and emotional atmosphere. Breaking into this, Challenor enters and greets the men who will perform for him tonight. He gives some words of advice about what he is looking for, in stark contradiction to the lessons Waters has been trying to teach, and leaves. In his wake, the men have frantic arguments over whether to change their act to please the scout.

=== Act 2 ===
The action moves to the club, the scene of the men's performances. First on is Mick Connor, who delivers a routine based on his identity as an Irishman in England, staying true to his previous stand-up. Next up is Sammy Samuels, who offers a fast-paced collection of jokes about women and sex, as well as satirising his Jewishness. He has sold out for a shot at fame. Thirdly, the brothers Ged and Phil Murray begin a chaotic performance in which they have an argument onstage about their act, resulting in a dismal failure. Then George McBrain tells a range of racist and sexist jokes. Lastly, Gethin Price comes carrying a tiny violin and bow, dressed in a bizarre mime-style outfit. After crushing the violin, he launches into a kata and other kung fu exercises. Two shop mannequins, a man and woman, are illuminated in the corner. Price begins a crazed conversation with the dummies before stabbing them and shouting a stream-of-consciousness monologue. He plays The Red Flag on another, unbroken violin, and leaves. The club secretary restarts the bingo.

=== Act 3 ===
The comedians are back in the classroom after the show. Samuels and McBrain attack Price for his surrealist routine, while Connor, Ged and Phil feel dejected after their performances. Challenor enters and assesses the men act by act. Connor and the Murray brothers are admonished, while Samuels and McBrain are praised for their stereotyped jokes that titillate the audience. He reserves the strongest condemnation for Price, who he describes as "aggressively unfunny" and "repulsive". After summarising, Challenor reveals that he will take Samuels and McBrain under his wing, and exits. Most of the men leave for the pub, and only Waters, Price and Mr Patel remain. Waters tells Price that his act was brilliant, and goes on to tell an emotionally charged anecdote about performing comedy during the Second World War in Bielefeld. Price leaves, the men parting on good terms. Finally, Mr Patel tells a joke to Waters, and they exit the classroom.

== List of characters ==
- Eddie Waters: a retired comedian who now teaches stand-up at evening classes
- Bert Challenor: a retired comedian, now President of the powerful Comedy Federation
- Gethin Price: a man in his early twenties, aspiring stand-up
- Phil Murray: a man desperate to get out of working-class life, aspiring stand-up
- Ged Murray: Phil's brother and comedy partner, aspiring stand-up
- George McBrain: a Northern Irishman, aspiring stand-up
- Mick Connor: a Southern Irishman, aspiring stand-up
- Sammy Samuels: a Jewish man, aspiring stand-up
- Club Secretary: a man who runs the club at which the comedians perform
- Caretaker: an old, gnarled man
- Mr Patel: an Asian man who enters the classroom by mistake

== Stage productions ==
=== World premiere ===
Comedians was first presented at the Nottingham Playhouse on 20 February 1975, directed by Richard Eyre. Cast:

- Jonathan Pryce as Gethin Price
- Stephen Rea as George McBrain
- Louis Raynes as Sammy Samuels
- Tom Wilkinson as Mick Connor
- Jimmy Jewel as Eddie Waters
- Dave Hill as Ged Murray
- James Warrior as Phil Murray
- Talat Hussain as Mr Patel
- Ralph Nossek as Bert Challenor
- John Joyce as Club Secretary
- Richard Simpson as Caretaker

=== American premiere ===
The play moved to Broadway during the 1976/77 season, and ran at the Music Box for 145 performances. The production was virtually recast. Milo O'Shea now played the teacher, but Jonathan Pryce retained his role and he was the only British actor in the first American production. He won the Tony for Best Featured Actor in a play. It was directed by Mike Nichols, who was nominated for the Tony as Best Director of a play.

=== Revivals ===
Comedians was revived by Bickerstaffe Theatre Company in 1999, and it went on to win the Best Production of the Dublin Theatre Festival in that year. It was directed by Jimmy Fay, and the actors were Brian de Salvo, Dan Gordon, Karl Shiels and Aidan Kelly.

Comedians was revived off-Broadway in 2003, with Jim Dale as the teacher, Raul Esparza as the student comedian, and David McCallum as the agent.

A London revival opened at the Lyric Theatre, Hammersmith on 7 October 2009, at the beginning of the artistic directorship of Sean Holmes. The production starred Matthew Kelly as the teacher Eddie Waters, Keith Allen as the agent Bert Challenor. The rest of the cast was Mark Benton, Reece Shearsmith, David Dawson, Billy Carter, Michael Dylan, Kulvinder Ghir, Simon Kunz, Paul Rider and Nick Williamson.

== Television productions ==
A 25-minute extract from the play was screened as part of BBC2's 2nd House arts strand on 15 March 1975, directed by Richard Eyre and Ben Rea, with the selected members of the original stage cast:

- Jimmy Jewel as Eddie Waters
- Jonathan Pryce as Gethin Price
- Stephen Rea as George McBrain
- James Warrior as Phil Murray
- David Hill as Ged Murray
- Tom Wilkinson as Mick Connor
- Louis Raynes as Sammie Samuels
- Richard Simpson as Caretaker

A 95-minute version of the full play was adapted for the Play for Today strand, broadcast on 25 October 1979, produced and directed by Eyre.

- Bill Fraser as Eddie Waters
- Jonathan Pryce as Gethin Price
- John Barrett as Caretaker
- James Warrior as Phil Murray
- Derrick O'Connor as George McBrain
- Linal Haft as Sammy Samuels
- David Burke as Mike Connor
- Edward Peel as Ged Murray
- Ralph Nossek as Bert Challenor
- Moti Makan as Mr Patel
- Mike Henson as Concert Secretary
