= Chalk and Cheese =

1979 British TV series

- Created by: Alex Shearer
- Country of origin: United Kingdom
- Original language: English
- No. of series: 1
- No. of episodes: 6

Production
- Running time: 22 minutes
- Production company: Thames Television

Original release
- Network: ITV
- Release: 2 April – 7 May 1979

Chalk and Cheese is a sitcom television series, featuring Michael Crawford and Robin Hawdon.

The concept began life as an earlier one-off comedy in 1977 called Spasms, which was re-cast and remade as the first episode of the series. Only Hawdon remained in his part from the original one-off comedy, since Jonathan Pryce, playing the other character, was occupied elsewhere.

Crawford starred as Dave Finn, a scruffy, sexist and outspoken Cockney who lives in an otherwise genteel, well-to-do street, much to the annoyance of his neighbours. Robin Hawdon played Roger Scott, Finn's adjoining neighbour, a high-flying marketing executive and very much the polar opposite of Finn. Also appearing were Gillian Martell as Finn's wife Rose, and Julia Goodman as Roger's wife Amanda. The series, made by Thames Television, came on the back of the success of Crawford playing Frank Spencer in the BBC's Some Mothers Do 'Ave 'Em. Crawford was eager not to be typecast and the character he played here was considerably different to that of Frank. However he claimed that audiences did not take to his character, and after an offer of another starring stage role, it was cancelled after only one series.
