= Michael Crawford =

English actor (born 1942)

Michael Crawford CBE
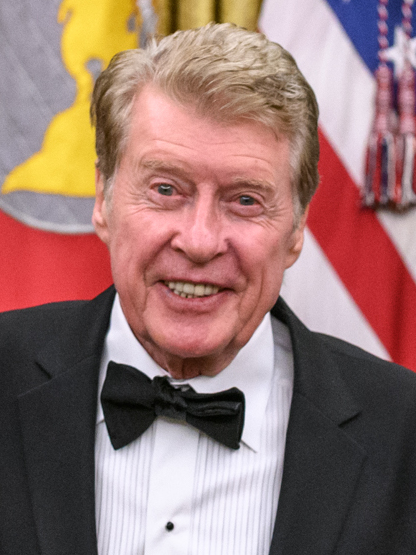
- Crawford in 2025
- Born: Michael Patrick Smith; 19 January 1942 (age 84); Salisbury, Wiltshire, England
- Occupations: Actor; comedian; singer; stuntman
- Years active: 1955–present
- Known for: Some Mothers Do 'Ave 'Em, The Phantom of the Opera, Hello, Dolly!
- Spouse(s): Gabrielle Lewis (m. 1965; div. 1975) Natasha MacAller
- Children: 3
- Website: mcifa.com

Michael Patrick Smith (born 19 January 1942), known professionally as Michael Crawford, is an English actor, comedian and singer.

Crawford is best known for playing the hapless Frank Spencer in the sitcom Some Mothers Do 'Ave 'Em, Cornelius Hackl in the musical film Hello, Dolly!, and the titular character in the stage musical The Phantom of the Opera. His acclaimed performance in the last of these earned him both the Laurence Olivier Award for Best Actor in a Musical and Tony Award for Best Actor in a Musical. He has received international critical acclaim and won numerous awards during his acting career, which has included many film and television performances as well as stage work on both London's West End and on New York's Broadway.

Crawford has also published the autobiography Parcel Arrived Safely: Tied With String. Since 1987, he has served as the leader and public face for the British social cause organisation the Sick Children's Trust.

== Early life and education ==
Crawford was brought up by his mother, Doris Agnes Mary Pike, and her parents, Montague Pike and his wife, Edith (née Keefe or O'Keefe), in what Crawford described as a "close-knit Roman Catholic family". His maternal grandmother was born in County Londonderry, Ireland, and lived to be 99 years old. His mother's first husband, Arthur Dumbell "Smudge" Smith, who was not his biological father, was killed, aged 22, on 6 September 1940 during the Battle of Britain, less than a year after they married. Sixteen months after Smith's death, Michael was born, the result of a short-lived relationship. His widowed mother gave her son her married surname, that of her late husband.

During his early years, Crawford divided his time between the army camp in Wiltshire, where he and his mother lived during the war, and the Isle of Sheppey in Kent. The isle was where his mother had grown up and where Crawford would later live with his mother and maternal grandparents. He attended St Michael's, a Catholic school in Bexleyheath which was run by nuns. Crawford later described them as not being shy in their use of corporal punishment.

At the end of the Second World War, his mother remarried, to grocer Lionel Dennis "Den" Ingram. The family moved to Herne Hill in London, where Crawford attended Oakfield Preparatory School, Dulwich. There he was known as Michael Ingram. According to him, his mother's second husband was abusive.

== Acting career ==
=== Career beginnings ===
Crawford made his first stage appearance in the role of Sammy the Little Sweep in his school production of Benjamin Britten's Let's Make an Opera, conducted by Donald Mitchell. It was transferred to Brixton Town Hall in London. He auditioned, unsuccessfully, for the role of Miles in Britten's The Turn of the Screw – the role was given to another boy soprano, David Hemmings. But Crawford's audition so impressed Britten that in 1955 he hired him to play Sammy, alternating with David Hemmings, in another production of Let's Make an Opera, this time at the Scala Theatre in London. Credited as Michael Ingram, singing the role of Gay Brook, he participated in a recording of the opera made that same year, conducted by the composer.

In 1958, Crawford was hired by the English Opera Group in the role of Jaffet in Noye's Fludde, Britten's setting of the Chester miracle play of the Genesis flood narrative. Crawford remembers that it was while working in this production that he realised he seriously wanted to become an actor. It was in between performances of Let's Make an Opera and Noye's Fludde that he was advised to change his name, "to avoid confusion with a television newsman called Michael Ingram[s] who was registered with British Equity". He adopted Crawford.

Crawford performed in a wide repertoire. Among his stage work, he performed in André Birabeau's French comedy Head of the Family (Dame Nature), Neil Simon's Come Blow Your Horn, Bernard Kops's Change for the Angel, Francis Swann's Out of the Frying Pan, Shakespeare's Julius Caesar, Coriolanus, and Twelfth Night, Oscar Wilde's The Importance of Being Earnest, The Striplings, The Move After Checkmate and others.

In the same period, he appeared in hundreds of BBC radio broadcasts and early television series, such as Billy Bunter of Greyfriars School, Emergency - Ward 10, Probation Officer, and Two Living, One Dead. He appeared as the cabin boy John Drake in the television series Sir Francis Drake, a 26-part adventure series made by ITC starring Terence Morgan and Jean Kent. He made his film debut in 1958 with leading roles in two children's films, Blow Your Own Trumpet and Soapbox Derby, for the Children's Film Foundation in Britain.

In 1961, Crawford appeared in an episode of One Step Beyond called "The Villa", in which he played a character experimenting with strobe lights. Crawford appears in the only surviving episode of the 1960 British crime series Police Surgeon alongside Ian Hendry. This series would spawn the much better-known The Avengers.

=== Early adult career ===
At age nineteen, Crawford was approached to play an American, Junior Sailen, in the film The War Lover (1962), which starred Steve McQueen. To prepare for the role, he would spend hours listening to Woody Woodbury, a famous American comedian of the time, to try to perfect an American accent. After The War Lover, Crawford briefly returned to the stage. After playing the lead role in the 1963 British film Two Left Feet, he was offered a role in the British television series, Not So Much a Programme, More a Way of Life, as the Mod-style, tough-talking, motor-scooter riding Byron.

It was this character that attracted film director Richard Lester to hire him for the role of Colin in The Knack ...and How to Get It in 1965. The film was a huge success in the UK.

Lester also cast Crawford in the film adaptation of the Stephen Sondheim musical, A Funny Thing Happened on the Way to the Forum, and in How I Won the War, starring Roy Kinnear and John Lennon. (During filming Crawford lived in London with Lennon and his first wife Cynthia, and Gabrielle Lewis). Crawford starred in The Jokers (directed by Michael Winner) with Oliver Reed in 1967.

=== Broadway debut ===
In 1967, Crawford made his Broadway début in Peter Shaffer's Black Comedy with Lynn Redgrave (making her début as well). He demonstrated his aptitude and daring for extreme physical comedy, such as walking into walls and falling down staircases.

While working in the show, he was noticed by Gene Kelly, who called him to Hollywood to audition for a part in the film adaptation of the musical Hello, Dolly!. Crawford was cast and shared top billing with Barbra Streisand and Walter Matthau. Despite being one of the highest-grossing works of 1969, the film failed to recoup its $25 million budget at the box office. It won three Academy Awards, was nominated for a further four (including Best Picture), and is now considered to be one of the greatest musical films ever.

Crawford's later films fared less successfully, although Alice's Adventures in Wonderland, in which he played the White Rabbit, enjoyed moderate success in the UK. After performing in Alice's Adventures in Wonderland, and with offers of work greatly reduced and much of his salary from Hello, Dolly! lost, reportedly due to underhanded investments by his agent, Crawford faced a brief period of unemployment.

During this time, he helped his wife stuff cushions (for their upholstery business) and took a job as an office clerk in an electric company. But at this difficult time, his marriage fell apart and divorce followed in 1975.

=== Some Mothers Do 'Ave 'Em ===
Crawford's acting career took off again after he appeared on the London stage in the farce No Sex Please, We're British, in which he played the part of frantic chief cashier Brian Runnicles. This performance led to an invitation to star in a BBC television comedy series about a childlike and eternally haphazard man who causes disaster everywhere he goes. Crawford was not the first choice for the role of Frank Spencer in Some Mothers Do 'Ave 'Em. Originally, the show was offered to Ronnie Barker, who turned it down, and then to Norman Wisdom, who did likewise, but Crawford took on the challenge. He adopted a characterisation similar to the one he employed for Brian Runnicles. Cast alongside him was Michele Dotrice in the role of Frank's long-suffering wife, Betty.

Some Mothers Do 'Ave 'Em soon became one of the BBC's most popular television series. Initially, only two series were produced, in 1973 and 1975, as the show's creators felt it should stop at its peak, but popular demand saw the programme revived for a final series in 1978. Its immense popularity was due in part to its extensive use of physical comedy. Crawford said he had always been a fan of comedians such as Buster Keaton (with whom he co-starred in A Funny Thing Happened on the Way to the Forum), Laurel and Hardy, and Charlie Chaplin, as well as the sight gags employed in the days of silent film. He saw Some Mothers as the ideal opportunity to practice such humour. He performed his own stunts during the show's run and never used a double.

=== 1970s ===
While he was playing in Some Mothers Do 'Ave 'Em, Crawford was approached to star in the musical Billy (based on the novel Billy Liar), which opened in 1974 at the Theatre Royal, Drury Lane in London. This was his first leading man role on the West End stage; it helped to firmly establish his career as both a singer and showman. The part was demanding, requiring proficiency in both song and dance. In preparation for the role, Crawford began taking both arts more seriously, studying singing under the tutelage of vocal coach Ian Adam and spending hours perfecting his dancing with choreographer Onna White.

Billy gave the many fans of Crawford's portrayal of Frank Spencer an opportunity to see him in a broadly similar role on the stage, and was a considerable hit (904 West End performances). After the closing of Some Mothers Do 'Ave 'Em, Crawford continued to perform in plays and musicals, starring in Flowers for Algernon (1979) in the role of Charlie Gordon, based on the book of the same title. He pursued another role on an ITV sitcom, Chalk and Cheese, as the slovenly, uncouth Dave Finn. The show did not go over well with his fans: the popularity of Crawford's portrayal of Frank Spencer, and the similar Billy Fisher character, had left him somewhat typecast, to the extent that they could not accept his very different role as Dave Finn. Crawford abandoned the show during its first series and returned to theatre work.

=== 1980s ===
==== Condorman ====
Crawford starred in the 1981 Disney comedy/adventure film Condorman, playing an eccentric American comic book writer and illustrator named Woody Wilkins who is asked by his friend at the CIA to help a Russian woman to defect while acting out the fantasy of bringing his comic book creation, Condorman, to life. Critics panned the film. On their television show, critics Gene Siskel and Roger Ebert featured the film in their round-up of the year's worst films pointing out the less-than-special effects such as the visible harness and cable used to suspend Condorman in the air and the obvious bluescreen effect. The film performed poorly at the box office but years later gained a cult following among Disney fans.

==== Barnum ====
Also in 1981, Crawford starred in the original London production of Cy Coleman's Barnum (1981) as the illustrious American showman P. T. Barnum. He trained at the Big Apple Circus School in New York City to prepare for the ambitious stunts, learning to walk the tight-rope, juggle and slide down a rope from the rafters of the theatre. After further training for the second opening of Barnum, he was awarded a British Amateur Gymnastics Association badge and certificate as a qualified coach.

Barnum opened on 11 June 1981 at the London Palladium, where it ran for 655 performances. Crawford and Deborah Grant headed the cast. It was well-received, becoming a favourite of Margaret Thatcher as well as the Queen Mother. Crawford earned his first Olivier Award for Best Actor in a Musical on the London stage. After the initial production of the show, he worked extensively with Torvill and Dean, and can be seen rinkside with them as they received their "perfect six" marks in the 1983 world championships for their 'Barnum' routine.

In 1984 a revival of Barnum opened in Manchester at the Opera House, ending the tour at the Victoria Palace in the West End. In 1986 this production, with a new cast, though still headed by Crawford, was recorded for television and broadcast by the BBC. Crawford's Barnum is one of the longest runs by a leading actor.

==== The Phantom of the Opera ====
In 1984, at the final preview of Starlight Express, Crawford happened to run into the show's creator, Andrew Lloyd Webber. Lloyd Webber had met Crawford socially several times and remembered him from his work in Flowers for Algernon. He informed Crawford that he was working on a new project based on a Gaston Leroux novel and wanted to know whether he was interested. Crawford said he was, but the show was still in the early planning stages, and nothing had been decided. Several months passed, during which Lloyd Webber had already created a pitch video featuring his then-wife Sarah Brightman as the female lead Christine, and British rocker Steve Harley as the Phantom, singing the title song in the manner of a contemporary new wave video. Crawford was turned off by that, supposing the songwriter had chosen to do a "rock opera"-inspired spectacle in lieu of a more traditional operatic musical.

Since casting Harley, however, Lloyd Webber had also begun to regret his artistic choices. According to the Behind the Mask documentary, he and producer Cameron Mackintosh agreed that Harley was neither an actor nor a commanding theatre presence, two areas in which Crawford had gained significant experience by this point. As production continued on the show, the bulk of the score was revealing itself to be far more classical and operatic, entirely unsuited to Harley's rough, contemporary voice. Wanting instead a performer with a more classic, melodic voice, as described in the original book, he began yet another search for the perfect actor to play his Phantom.

Crawford's landing of the role was due in large part to the coincidence that he and Brightman were taking lessons from the same vocal coach, Ian Adam. Brightman and her husband had arrived early for her lesson, and it was while waiting that they chanced to hear Crawford practising the aria Care Selve, from the opera Atalanta by Handel. Intrigued, Lloyd Webber asked Adam who his student was. Soon after, Crawford was called in for an audition and was hired virtually on the spot.

Many critics were sceptical; Crawford was still largely pigeonholed as the hapless Frank Spencer, and questions were asked about his ability to manage such a vocally and dramatically demanding role.

In September 1986, Crawford commenced as the Phantom in London at Her Majesty's Theatre, continuing in the role until October of the following year. In January 1988, Crawford started performing the show on Broadway, finishing his run in October. He then went on to do the show in Los Angeles in 1989. He was the Phantom for three and a half years and over 1,300 performances across the three productions, winning the Olivier Award (Best Actor in a Musical), the Tony Award (Best Performance by an Actor in a Lead Role, Musical), a New York Drama Desk Award, and a Los Angeles Drama Critics Circle Award for Distinguished Achievement in Theatre (Lead Performance).

During the Los Angeles run, Crawford was asked to sing "The Music of the Night" at the Inaugural Gala for President George H. W. Bush in Washington, D.C., on 19 January 1989. At the gala, Crawford was presented with a cake in celebration of his 47th birthday.

On 29 April 1990, Crawford left the show. He admits to having been saddened at his departure, and, during the final Lair scene, altered the Phantom's line to "Christine... I loved you", acknowledging that this was his final performance. However, on 31 December 1990, he returned to the role in Los Angeles, replacing Robert Guillaume. Crawford's final performance as the Phantom was on 28 April 1991.

=== 1990s ===
At the request of Liz Kirschner, wife of film producer David Kirschner, he obtained the role of Cornelius in 20th Century Fox's animated film Once Upon a Forest, which was produced by her husband.

In 1995, Crawford created the high-profile starring role in EFX, the US$70 million production which officially opened the 1,700-seat MGM Grand Theatre in Las Vegas. The Atlantic Theater label released the companion album to EFX. Early into the run, Crawford suffered an accident during a performance (which involved him sliding from a wire hanger from the back of the theatre all the way to the stage and then jumping down 12 feet (3.7 m) to the stage itself) and left the show to recover from his injury, which resulted in a hip replacement operation.

=== 2000s to present ===
In 2001, Crawford sang Baby Mine from Disney's Dumbo on its 60th anniversary VHS and DVD. Crawford had a short comeback to Broadway as the Count von Krolock in the short-lived musical Dance of the Vampires (2002–03). He originated the role of Count Fosco in Lloyd Webber's The Woman in White, which opened at the Palace Theatre, London in September 2004. However, he was forced to leave the show three months later because of ill health caused by dehydration resulting from the enormous fat-suit he wore during the performance. He spent months recuperating and was thus unable to reprise the role on Broadway. He learned he was suffering from the post-viral condition myalgic encephalomyelitis (ME), from which he did not fully recover for six years.

In 2006, Crawford attended the Gala Performance of the stage version of The Phantom of the Opera on Broadway at the Majestic Theatre to celebrate the show's becoming the longest-running musical in Broadway history (surpassing the run of Cats). He was delighted with it, stating this was the first time he had been an audience member of any of the shows he had done.

In 2007, Crawford briefly relocated to New Zealand to be closer to one of his daughters who had settled in Australia, and to convalesce from ME. He has since returned and now lives there permanently.

On 23 October 2010, Crawford attended the celebratory 10,000th performance of The Phantom of the Opera in London alongside composer Andrew Lloyd Webber. Crawford spoke of his own memories of the first performance 24 years earlier, and was then presented, along with Lloyd Webber, with a special cake to commemorate the landmark achievement.

Beginning with previews in February 2011, Crawford originated the part of the Wizard in the new Andrew Lloyd Webber/Tim Rice musical version of The Wizard of Oz at the London Palladium, which had its official opening on 1 March 2011. He stated on This Morning: Sunday, on 14 August 2011, that he had signed on for a further six months in the show. He left the production on 5 February 2012; the same day as co-star Danielle Hope played her final performance as Dorothy. From 14 February, Russell Grant took over the role.

On 2 October 2011 Crawford made a special appearance during the finale of The Phantom of the Opera at the Royal Albert Hall — a fully staged production of the musical at the famous London venue – marking 25 years since the show received its world premiere. Although reunited with Sarah Brightman, he did no real singing as he had just finished performing in a matinee of The Wizard of Oz at the London Palladium.

On 18 March 2016 Crawford and Dotrice reprised their roles in a one-off special of Some Mothers Do 'Ave 'Em, broadcast as part of the Sport Relief charity fundraiser event.

Crawford starred in the new West End musical The Go-Between which premiered on 27 May 2016 at Apollo Theatre. He appeared in the 60th anniversary performance of Britten's Noye's Fludde in London in 2018, performing the Voice of God, and recalled in a BBC Radio 3 interview Benjamin Britten's valuable support in his early career.

To date, The Go-Between is Crawford's last stage performance. He reportedly has not retired, however. He had been attached to play Clarence Odbody for at least two years in Paul McCartney's planned musical adaptation of Frank Capra's It's a Wonderful Life, which was scheduled to premiere in "late 2020," but the production fell through.

In 2025, it was reported that Crawford plans to make a documentary about his career.

== Recording career and chart success ==
In 1987, during Crawford's starring role in The Phantom of the Opera, a double A-sided single was released featuring two songs from the musical: "The Music of the Night", sung by Crawford, and "Wishing You Were Somehow Here Again", sung by his Phantom co-star Sarah Brightman. It reached number seven in the UK Singles Chart.

Following on from this, in the same year Crawford released a studio album of show tunes with the London Symphony Orchestra, titled Songs from the Stage and Screen, which reached number 12 in the UK Albums Chart and number 74 on the Australian Music Report chart. From this album, his version of "When You Wish Upon a Star" was released as a single, reaching number 97 in the UK Singles Chart.

Songs from the Stage and Screen was followed by other charting studio albums recorded by Crawford, including With Love / The Phantom Unmasked (1989), Michael Crawford Performs Andrew Lloyd Webber (1991), A Touch of Music in the Night (1993), On Eagle's Wings (1998) and The Disney Album (2001), as well as several compilation albums. A Touch of Music in the Night included a new version of the Phantom song "The Music of the Night", this time recorded as a duet between Crawford and Barbra Streisand. Released as a single, it reached number 54 in the UK Singles Chart in early 1994. It was also included on Streisand's album Back to Broadway (1993), and was nominated for Best Pop Performance by a Duo or Group with Vocals at the 1994 Grammy Awards.

== Concert tours ==
In 2006, he made a small concert tour of Australia and New Zealand, as well as a one-night benefit to open the LaSalle Bank Theatre in Chicago. He has also done various Michael Crawford International Fan Association (MCIFA) exclusive concerts around the US.

== Charity work ==
Since the late 1980s, Crawford has affiliated himself with various charities, particularly for the good of children. He is a patron of the Lighthouse Foundation in Australia, and has also been President of the Sick Children's Trust since 1987.

== Personal life ==
Crawford has three children. Two, born in 1966 and 1968, are daughters from his first marriage to Gabrielle Lewis. He also has an older daughter, with whom he has signed a legal agreement protecting her privacy.

In the mid-1990s, he began a long-term relationship with Natasha MacAller, an American dancer and chef. They are now married.

Shortly before appearing in The Go-Between, Crawford was diagnosed with prostate cancer and had his prostate removed.

== Accolades ==
- Named Show Business Personality of the Year by the Variety Club of Great Britain
- Voted No. 17, ahead of Queen Victoria, in the 100 Greatest Britons (2002) poll sponsored by the BBC
- BroadwayWorld UK Award for Best Featured Actor in a Musical for The Wizard of Oz (2011)
- Received Aardman Slapstick Visual Comedy Legend Award (2016) – cited works include Some Mothers Do 'Ave 'Em
- Received Kennedy Center Honors for lifetime artistic achievement on 7 December 2025.

Crawford was appointed Officer of the Order of the British Empire (OBE) in the 1987 Birthday Honours and Commander of the Order of the British Empire (CBE) in the 2014 New Year Honours for charitable and philanthropic services, particularly to children's charities.

Year	Awards	Category	Nominated work	Result	Ref.
1966	British Academy Film Awards	Most Promising Newcomer to Leading Film Roles	The Knack ...and How to Get It	Nominated	
1974	British Academy Television Awards	Best Actor	Some Mothers Do 'Ave 'Em	Nominated	
1975	British Academy Television Awards	Best Light Entertainment Performance	Some Mothers Do 'Ave 'Em	Nominated	
1979	Laurence Olivier Awards	Best Actor in a Musical	Charlie and Algernon	Nominated	
1981	Laurence Olivier Awards	Best Actor in a Musical	Barnum	Won	
1986	Laurence Olivier Awards	Best Actor in a Musical	The Phantom of the Opera	Won	
1988	Drama Desk Award	Outstanding Actor in a Musical	The Phantom of the Opera	Won	
1988	Outer Critics Circle Awards	Outstanding Actor in a Musical	The Phantom of the Opera	Won	
1988	Tony Awards	Best Actor in a Musical	The Phantom of the Opera	Won	
2004	Theatregoers' Choice Award	Best Actor in a Supporting Role in a Musical	The Woman in White	Won	
2004	Variety Club of Great Britain Award	Outstanding Stage Performance	The Woman in White	Won	
2005	Laurence Olivier Awards	Best Performance in a Supporting Role in a Musical	The Woman in White	Nominated	

== Stage ==
=== Theatre ===
Year	Title	Role(s)
1967	Black Comedy / White Lies	Brindsley Miller / Tom
1971	No Sex Please, We're British	Brian Runnicles
1974	Billy	Billy Liar
1979	Flowers for Algernon	Charlie Gordon
1981–1983; 1985–1986	Barnum	P.T. Barnum (West End)
1986–1991	The Phantom of the Opera	The Phantom of the Opera (West End, Broadway & Los Angeles)
1995–1996	EFX	The EFX Master / Merlin / P.T. Barnum / Harry Houdini / H.G. Wells
2002–2003	Dance of the Vampires	Count Giovanni von Krolock
2004	The Woman in White	Count Fosco
2011–2012	The Wizard of Oz	Professor Marvel / Emerald City Doorman / Tour Guide / The Wizard of Oz
2016	The Go-Between	Older Leo Colston

== Filmography ==
=== Film ===
Year	Title	Role
1958	Soapbox Derby	Peter Toms
1958	Blow Your Own Trumpet	Jim Fenn
1960	A French Mistress	Kent
1960	Sir Frances Drake	John Drake
1961	Two Living, One Dead	Nils Lindwall
1962	The War Lover	Sgt. Junior Sailen
1963	Two Left Feet	Alan Crabbe
1965	The Knack ...and How to Get It	Colin
1966	A Funny Thing Happened on the Way to the Forum	Hero
1967	The Jokers	Michael Tremayne
1967	How I Won the War	Lt. Earnest Goodbody
1969	Hello, Dolly!	Cornelius Hackl
1970	The Games	Harry Hayes
1970	Hello-Goodbye	Harry England
1972	Alice's Adventures in Wonderland	White Rabbit
1981	Condorman	Woody Wilkins/Cóndorman
1986	Barnum	P.T. Barnum
1993	Once Upon a Forest	Cornelius/Narrator (voice)
1999	The Ghosts of Christmas Eve	Himself (performer)

=== Television ===
Years	Title	TV company	Role
1959	Billy Bunter of Greyfriars School (Series 5)	BBC	Frank Nugent
1960	Saturday Playhouse (one episode)	BBC	Read
1960	Police Surgeon (episode "Easy Money")	ABC	
1961–1962	Sir Francis Drake	ITC for ABC / ATV	John Drake
1964–1965	Not So Much a Programme, More a Way of Life	BBC	Byron
1968	Cilla (one episode)	BBC	
1973–1978	Some Mothers Do 'Ave 'Em	BBC	Frank Spencer
1979	Chalk and Cheese	Thames Television	Dave Finn
1998	Noel's House Party (one episode)	BBC	Frank Spencer
1999	The Ghosts of Christmas Eve	Fox Family Channel	
2016	Sport Relief 2016	BBC	Frank Spencer

== Discography ==
=== Solo albums ===
List of studio albums, with selected chart positions and certifications
Title	Album details	Peak chart positions			Certifications
Title	Album details	AUS	UK	US	Certifications
Songs from the Stage and Screen (With the London Symphony Orchestra)	Released: 1987; Label: J&B Records (JB 332); Formats: CD, Cassette, LP	74	12	192	ARIA: Gold
With Love (With the London Symphony Orchestra)	Released: 1989; Label: TelStar (TCD 2340); Formats: CD, cassette, LP	–	31	–	ARIA: Gold
The Phantom Unmasked	Released: 1989; Label: Dino Music (125); Formats: CD, cassette, LP	77	–	–	
Michael Crawford Performs Andrew Lloyd Webber	Released: November 1991; Label: Atlantic (756782347–2); Formats: CD, cassette	1	3	54	ARIA: 3× Platinum
A Touch of Music in the Night	Released: October 1993; Label: Atlantic (756782531–2); Formats: CD, cassette	1	12	39	ARIA: 4× Platinum
Favourite Love Songs	Released: October 1994; Label: Atlantic (756782697–2); Formats: CD, cassette	18	64	–	ARIA: Platinum
On Eagle's Wings	Released: March 1998; Label: Atlantic (756783076–2); Formats: CD, cassette	5	65	57	ARIA: Platinum
Michael Crawford in Concert	Released: October 1998; Label: Atlantic (756783131–2); Formats: CD; Live album	31	–	–	ARIA: Gold
A Christmas Album / The Most Wonderful Time of the Year	Released: December 1999; Label: Atlantic (756783222–2); Formats: CD	62	69	98	
The Disney Album	Released: 18 September 2001; Label: Walt Disney Records (333662); Formats: CD	1	76	–	ARIA: Platinum
The Best of (Christmas Version)	Released: November 2001; Label: Atlantic (756793081–2); Formats: CD; Compilation album	10	–	–	ARIA: Platinum
The Best of	Released: 2002; Label: Atlantic (756793082–2); Formats: CD; Compilation album	66	–	–	
The Very Best of Michael Crawford	Released: 2004; Label: EMI (VTCD 685); Formats: CD; Compilation album	–	76	–	
The Story of My Life	Released: November 2011; Label: Union Square Music; Formats: CD, Download; Compilation album	7	–	–	
O Holy Night	Released: 16 November 2012; Label: Union Square Music/FanFare (FANFARE091); Formats: CD, Download	55	–	–	
The Story of My Life: The Ultimate Collection	Released: December 2012; Label: Union Square Music; Formats: CD, Download; Compilation album	–	44	–	ARIA: Gold
The Music of the Night	Released: September 2016; Label: Union Square Music/FanFare (FANFARE155); Formats: 2×CD, Download; Compilation album	–	–	–	

=== Video albums ===
List of video albums, with selected chart positions and certifications
Title	Album details	Peak chart positions	Certifications
Title	Album details	AUS DVD	Certifications
In Concert	Released: 1998; Label: Warner Music Vision; Formats: VHS, DVD	8	ARIA: Platinum

=== Cast albums ===
- A Funny Thing Happened on the Way to the Forum (1966)
- Hello, Dolly! (1969)
- Billy (1974)
- Flowers for Algernon (1980)
- Barnum (1981)
- The Phantom of the Opera (1987)
- Highlights from The Phantom of the Opera (1987)
- Once Upon a Forest (1993)
- EFX (1995) AUS No. 100
- The Woman in White (2004)
- WALL-E (2008) (excerpts from Hello, Dolly!)
- The Wizard of Oz (2011)

=== Guest appearances ===
- Save the Children: Christmas Carols and Festive Songs (1988) – "Let's Pretend"
- The Premiere Collection: The Best of Andrew Lloyd Webber (1988) – "The Music of the Night"
- Showstoppers (1991) – "Fugue for Tinhorns" (with Barry Manilow & Hinton Battle)
- A Christmas Spectacular of Carols and Songs (1992) – "Let's Pretend"
- Back to Broadway (1993) – "The Music of the Night" (with Barbra Streisand)
- David Foster: The Christmas Album (1993) – "O Holy Night"
- The London Symphony Orchestra Performs the Works of Tim Rice and Andrew Lloyd Webber (1994) – "The Phantom of the Opera" and "Jesus Christ Superstar" Suites
- The Andrew Lloyd Webber Collection (1999) – "The Phantom of the Opera" (with Sarah Brightman)
- Millennium Chorus: The Greatest Story Ever Sung (2000) – "How Still How Silent"
- Child of the Promise: A Musical Story Celebrating The Birth of Christ (2000) – "After All These Years", "Zacharias & Gabriel Recitative" (with Russ Taff), "He Will Prepare the Way"
- My Favorite Broadway: The Love Songs (2001) – "The Music of the Night"
- Standing Ovation: The Greatest Songs from the Stage (2012) – "The Music of the Night" (with Susan Boyle)

== See also ==
- List of British actors
