= Michael Joncas =

American Catholic priest and composer

Reverend Father Michael Joncas
- Priest of the Archdiocese of Saint Paul and Minneapolis
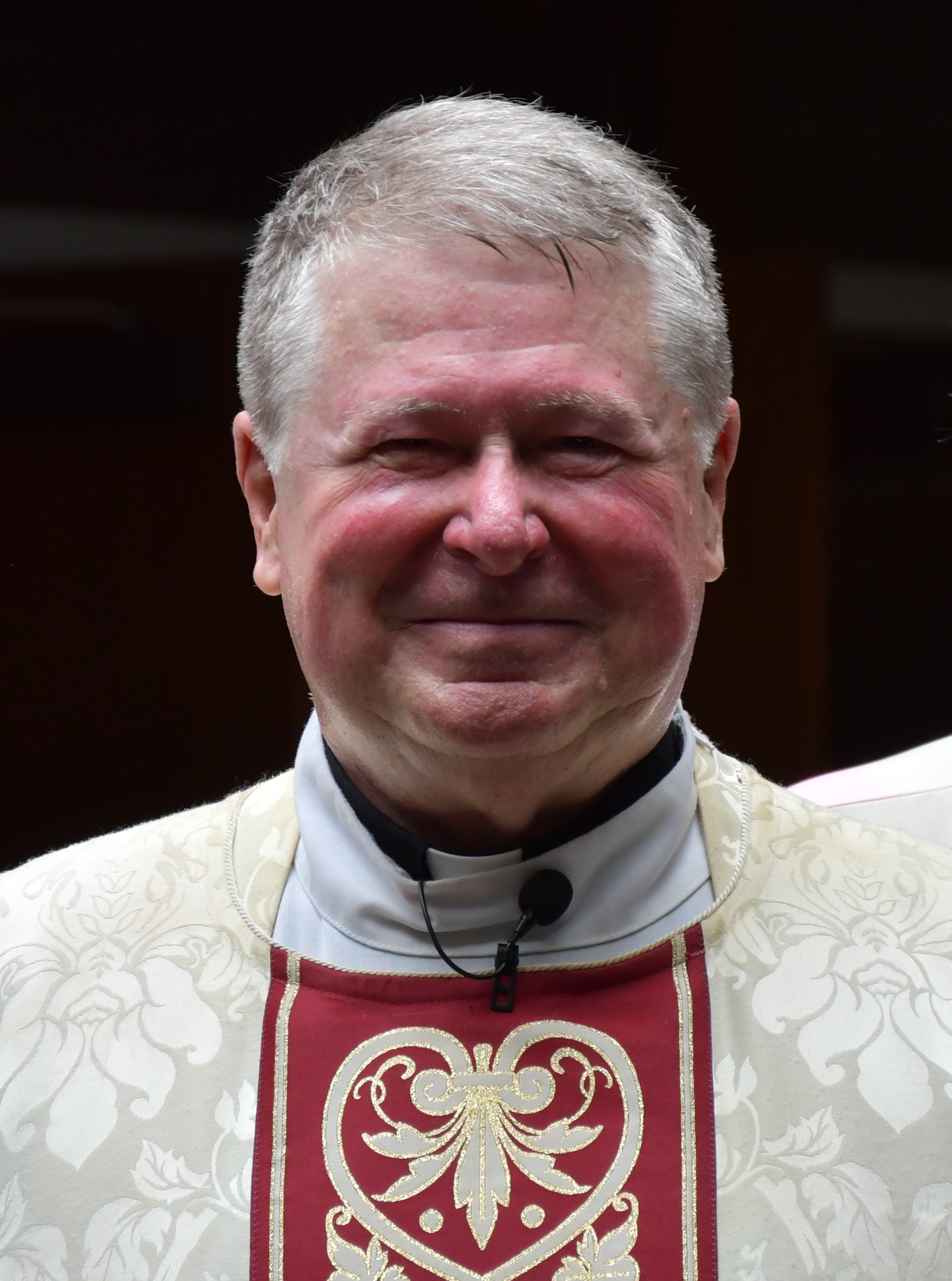
- Previous posts: Professor, University of St. Thomas; Professor, St. Paul Seminary; Professor, St. John's University

Orders
- Ordination: May 31, 1980 by John Roach

Personal details
- Born: December 21, 1951 (age 74)
- Occupation: Composer and Liturgist
- Education: Nazareth Hall Preparatory Seminary; St. John Vianney Seminary; University of Notre Dame; Pontifical Liturgical Institute

Jan Michael Joncas (born December 21, 1951) is an American Catholic priest, liturgical theologian, and composer of contemporary Catholic music. He is best known for his hymn "On Eagle's Wings".

== Biography ==
Joncas was raised in Minneapolis, of Polish descent, attending Nazareth Hall Preparatory Seminary and St. John Vianney Seminary at the University of St. Thomas, earning a bachelor's degree in English there in 1975.

Joncas composed the hymn he is best known for, "On Eagle's Wings", following the death of a friend's father in the late 1970s. It has since been quoted by Joe Biden , the Bellied Up podcast and covered by Lana Del Rey.

He received a Master of Arts degree in liturgy from the University of Notre Dame in 1978 and went on to study at the Pontifical Liturgical Institute in Rome, earning both his licentiate and doctorate degrees there. He was ordained to the priesthood on May 31, 1980, by Archbishop John Roach. Following this, he taught at the University of St. Thomas, at the University of Notre Dame, and summer courses at the Saint John's School of Theology, also serving as a weekend assistant at parishes throughout the Archdiocese.

In 2003, Joncas was diagnosed with Guillain–Barré syndrome after noticing he lacked the strength to elevate the chalice at Mass. The residual effects of the disorder still prevent him from playing guitar, the instrument on which he composed "On Eagle's Wings".

In 2022, Joncas retired from active ministry and teaching but stated an intention to keep writing music.

== Discography ==
- Singing In the Light (1968)
- On Eagles' Wings (1979; featuring "On Eagle's Wings")
- Every Stone Shall Cry
- Here In Our Midst
- O Joyful Light
- I Have Loved You
- Praise God in Song
- No Greater Love Mass
- Winter Name of God (1988)
- God of Life and of the Living
- Sing Praise and Thanksgiving
- Come to Me
- Mass for John Carroll
- Psallite Mass
- We Come to Your Feast
- A Voice Cries Out
- As the Deer
- God of Life Be Praised
- In the Sight of Angels (2008)
- Christ Be Near (2009)
- Shelter Me (2020)

== Published works ==
- Preaching the Rites of Christian Initiation, Forum Essays 4 (Chicago, IL: Liturgy Training Publications, 1994).
- The Catechism of the Catholic Church on Liturgy and Sacraments (San Jose, CA: Resource Publications, 1995).
- From Sacred Song to Ritual Music: Twentieth Century Understandings of Roman Catholic Worship Music (Collegeville, MN: The Liturgical Press, 1997).
- Co-author with Fr. Michael Driscoll, The Order of Mass: A Roman Missal Study Edition and Workbook (Chicago, IL: Liturgy Training Publications, 2011).
- Within Our Hearts Be Born. The Michael Joncas Hymnary: Advent and Christmas (Portland, OR: Oregon Catholic Press, 2013)
- We Contemplate the Mystery. The Michael Joncas Hymnary: Lent and Triduum (Portland, OR: Oregon Catholic Press, 2015).

== See also ==
- David Haas
- Marty Haugen
- Dan Schutte
- St. Louis Jesuits
