= Catholic Church in Sweden =

- Swedish: Katolska kyrkan i Sverige
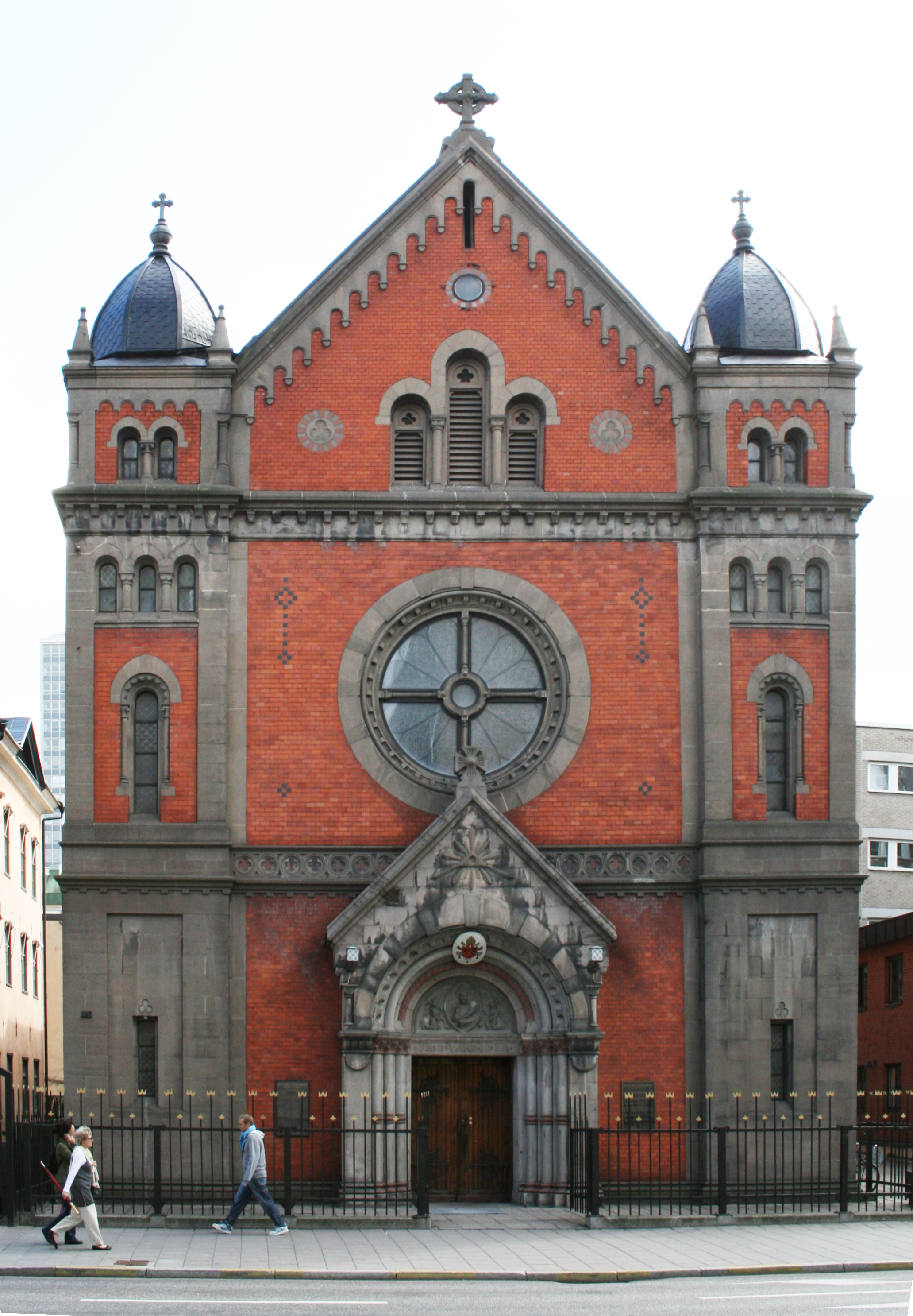
- Cathedral of Saint Eric, Stockholm
- Classification: Catholic
- Orientation: Latin
- Scripture: Bible
- Theology: Catholic theology
- Polity: Episcopal
- Governance: Scandinavian Bishops Conference
- Structure: Diocese
- Pope: Leo XIV
- Bishop: Anders Arborelius
- Apostolic Nuncio: Julio Murat
- Region: Sweden
- Language: Swedish, English, Latin
- Founder: St. Ansgar
- Origin: Circa 826; 1594-1599 de facto reestablished by King Sigismund of Sweden; 1781 legally reestablished as an apostolic vicariate
- Separations: Church of Sweden
- Members: Circa 125,000 registered members (circa 150,000 unofficially)
- Official website: Catholic Church in Sweden (English)

The Catholic Church in Sweden is part of the worldwide Catholic Church in communion with the Pope in Rome. It was established by Archbishop Ansgar in Birka in 829, and further developed by the Christianization of Sweden in the 9th century. King Olof Skötkonung (ca. 970–1021) is considered the first Christian king of Sweden.

In the Middle Ages, continental culture, philosophy and science spread to Sweden through the Catholic Church, which also founded schools, Uppsala University, hospitals as well as monasteries and convents. Several church representatives also became significant actors outside the religious sphere.

The Reformation in Sweden began in 1527 when King Gustav Vasa and his Riksdag of Västerås broke the full communion of the Swedish church with Rome, making it politically subservient to the kingdom. Controversies about the state of Catholicism in the Swedish church endured until the reigns of King John III (1568–1592) and the Catholic King Sigismund of Poland and Sweden (1592–1599).

At the Uppsala Synod in 1593, under the influence of Duke and future King Charles IX of Sweden, the Swedish church finally became a Lutheran state church, ratified by Charles' victory in his war against his Catholic predecessor in 1599. Governmental anti-Catholicism was imposed in Sweden, including deportations and death penalties for Catholics from 1599 to 1781.

Limited visits of individual foreign Catholics in Sweden were decriminalised through the Tolerance Act, imposed in 1781 by King Gustav III of Sweden. The conversion of Swedish citizens to the Catholic Church was decriminalized in 1860. In 1951, Swedish citizens were allowed to exit from the Lutheran Church of Sweden. In 1977, the last legislative ban on Catholic convents in Sweden was abolished. Still, however, according to the Act of Succession of the Swedish throne, only Lutheran legitimate descendants brought up in Sweden are presently entitled to succeed as monarch and the thus head of state of Sweden.

Since 1953, the Catholic Church in Sweden has been formally represented by the Diocese of Stockholm, covering the whole country, estimating some 106,873 registered members (2013), with unofficial estimates of about 150,000 Catholics in the country in total. Most of them have an immigrant background, while others are native Swede converts.

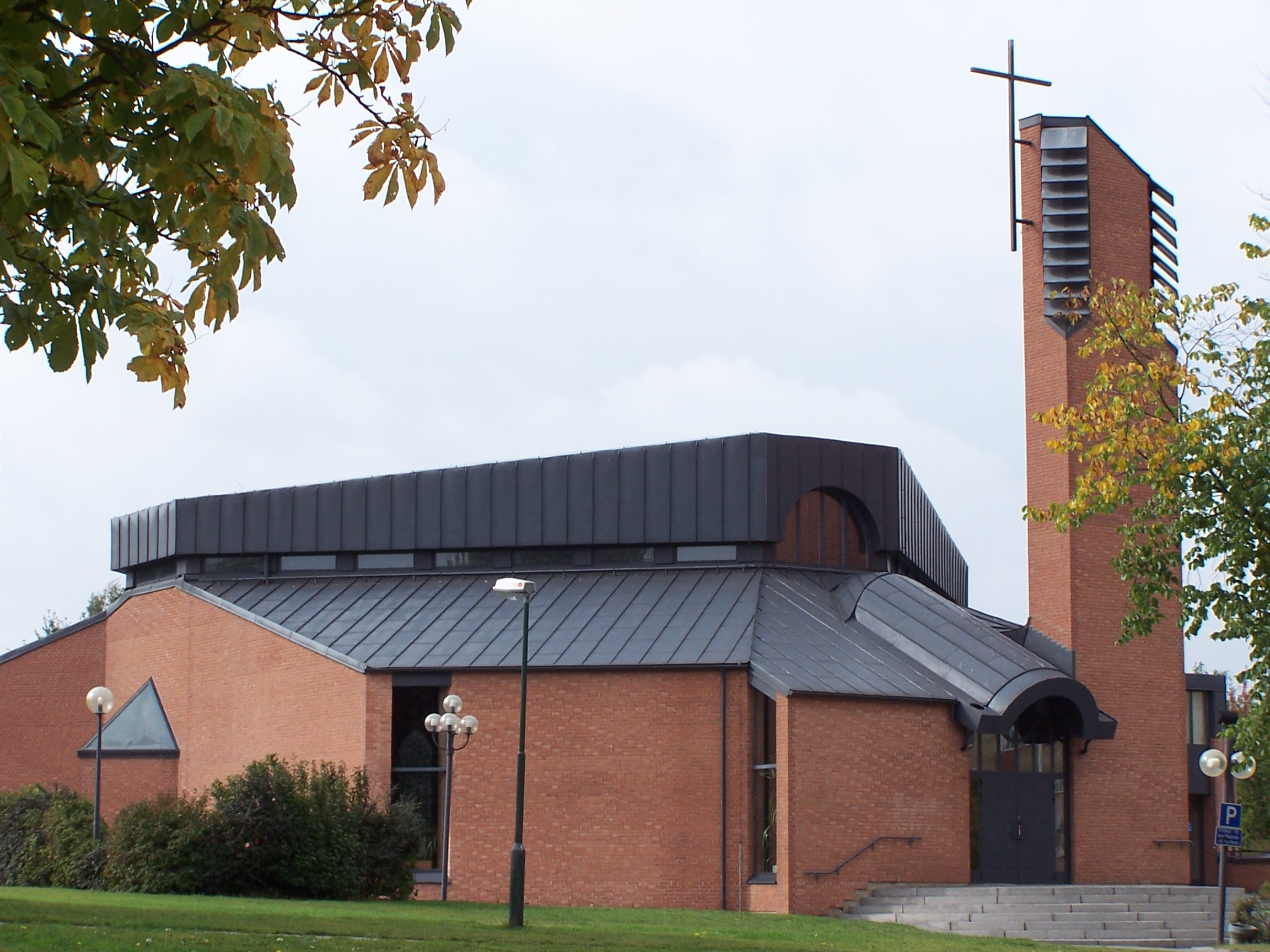
Sankta Maria i Rosengård, a Catholic church in Rosengård, Malmö

On 21 May 2017, Pope Francis named Bishop Anders Arborelius, the Ordinary of Stockholm, a Cardinal, a first for the Catholic Church in Sweden.

== Name ==
When the Swedish state gave "registered denominations" legal status in 2000, and the associations that had until that point organised the Catholic Church in Sweden became defunct, the church lost the right to the ordinary name. The administration of the diocese took it for granted that the name was the Catholic Church, that they had never applied to legally patent the name. Several smaller denominations, among them the Liberal Catholic Church, and the Old Catholic Church, opposed it calling itself the "Catholic Church". The solution was similar to the United Kingdom, where "Roman Catholic" has long been used to disambiguate from the high church movement of the Anglican Church that refer to themselves as "Anglo-Catholics". The church is therefore now registered under Swedish law as the "Roman Catholic Church" (Swedish: "Romersk-katolska kyrkan").

== History ==
The Catholic Church was the established church of Sweden from the Middle Ages until the Protestant Reformation in the 16th century, when King Gustav I severed relations with Rome. The Church of Sweden became Lutheran at the Uppsala Synod in 1593 when it adopted the Augsburg Confession to which most Lutherans adhere.

In 1654, Christina, Queen of Sweden caused much scandal when she abdicated her throne to convert to Catholicism. She is one of the few women buried in the Vatican grotto.

In the 1770s, the prominent Liberal Anders Chydenius - himself a Lutheran priest - prevailed upon King Gustav III to legalise the immigration of Catholics (as well as Jews) into Sweden. However, the Lutheran Church remained the only legal church in Sweden until the middle of the 19th century, when other churches were allowed. The Lutheran Church remained a state church until 2000.

=== First Nordic Missions (circa 829-1104) ===
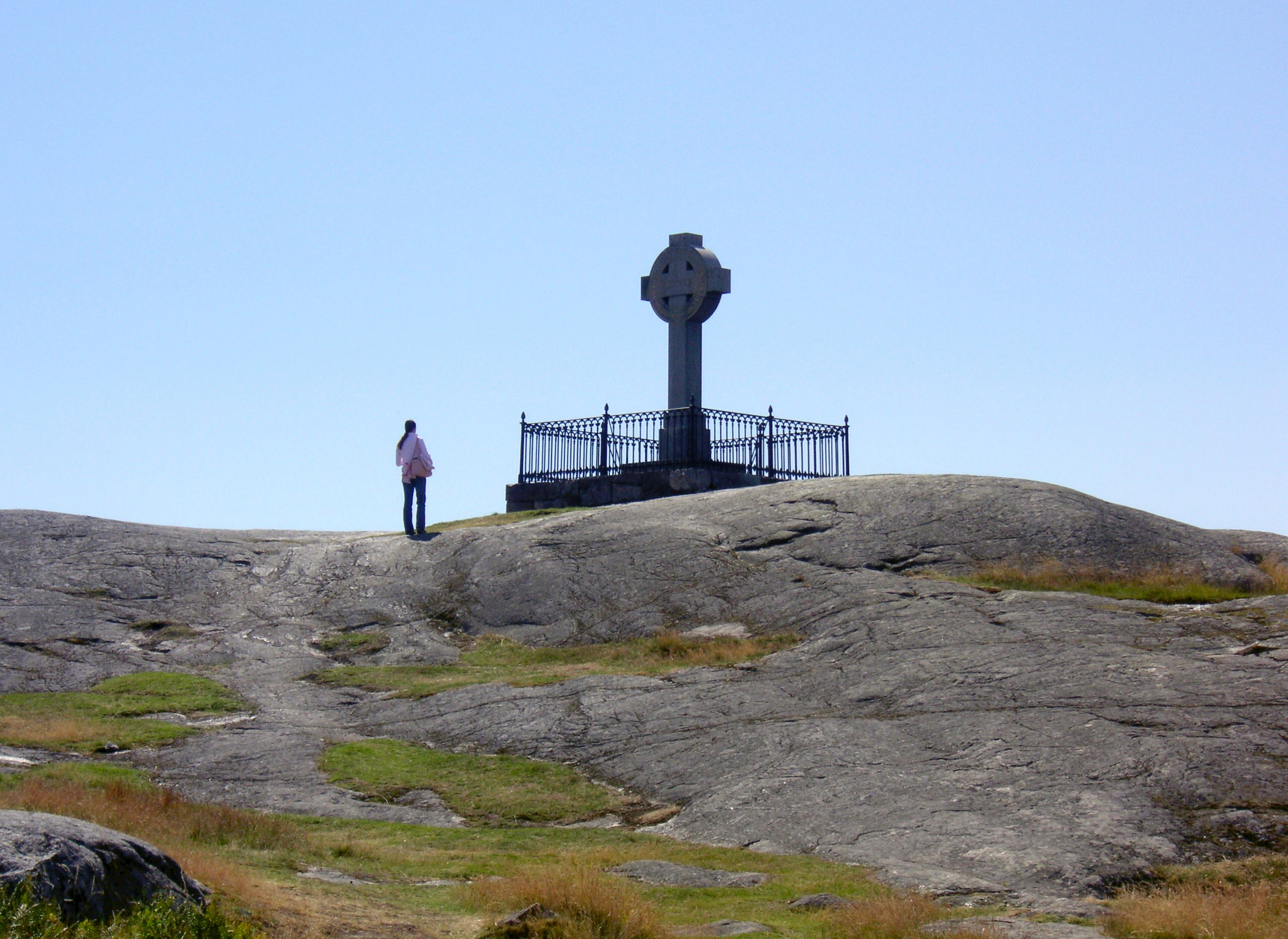
The Cross of Ansgar monument at Birka (2008).

When Emperor Louis the Pious was visited in 829 by two envoyés of the Swedish king, who messaged that several in their homeland were willing to convert to the Christian faith, he appointed Archbishop Ansgar for the mission. Ansgar and his assistant, the monk Witmar, followed with a convoy of merchants, but halfway they were attacked by vikings, and had to reach Birka on foot.

Archbishop Ansgar, sometimes called the "Apostle of the North", arrived in the town of Birka on an island in Lake Mälaren in 829 from the Archbishopric of Bremen, and founded ostensibly the first Christian parish in Sweden. Members included Herigar, evidently the first documented Christian Swede. However, findings from a Christian graveyard at Varnhem, dated to the 9th century, indicate that Christianity may have arrived before Ansgar. In addition, it is not unlikely that Christian slaves and other foreigners inhabited Sweden before that time.

The Swedish king at this time was Björn, according to Vita Ansgari, possibly Björn at Haugi.

Thereafter, Christianity slowly grew in Sweden from the 9th century until the late 11th century by people who came in contact with Christianity in other countries, and through missionaries from the Holy Roman Empire and England.

Götaland seems to have been Christianized before Svealand.

The first significant sign that Christianity had been established on a larger scale was the baptism of King Olof Skötkonungs circa 1008.

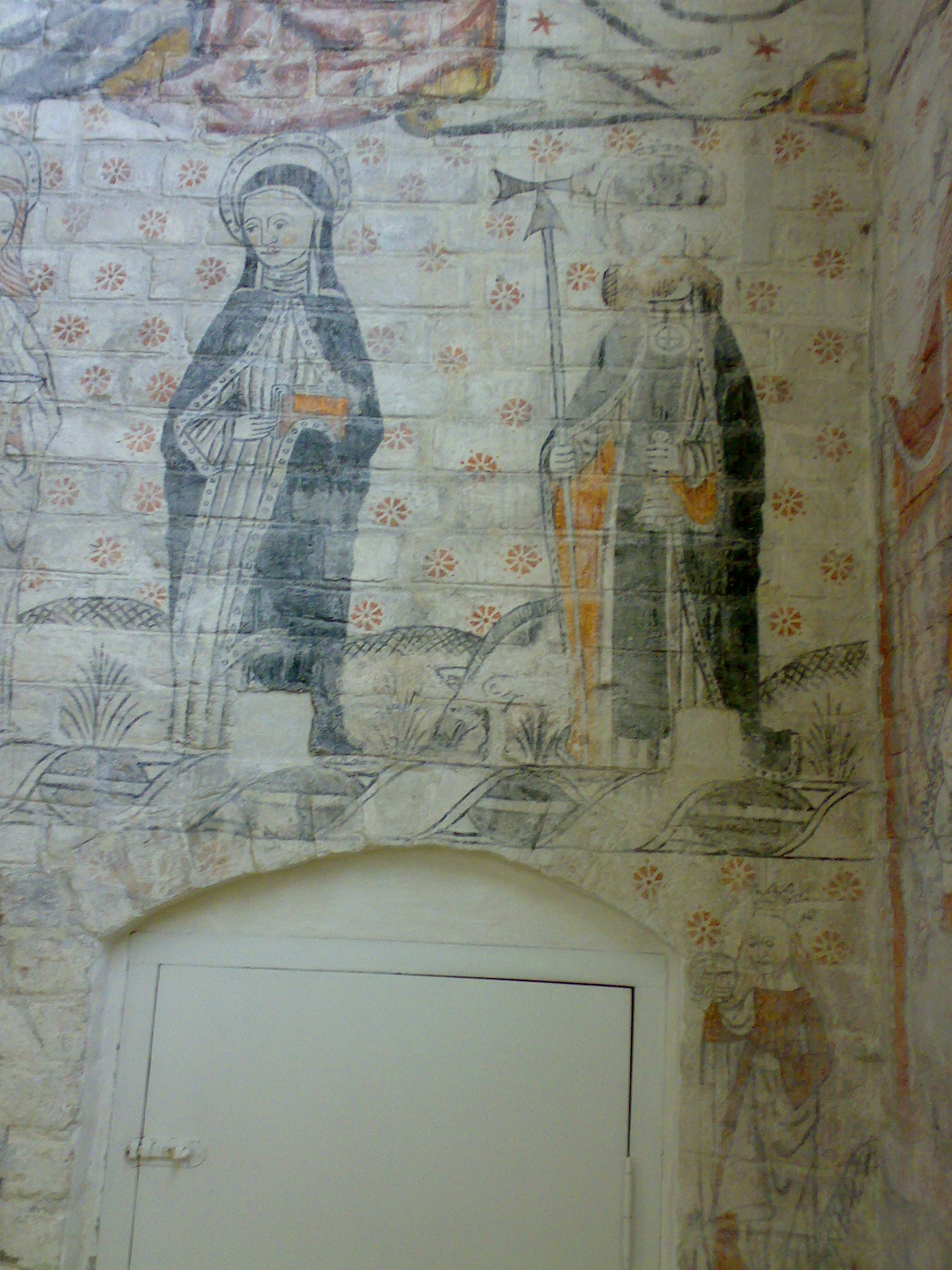
Saint Bridget.

According to Adam of Bremen, Olof Skötkonung was granted an ultimatum at the ting in Uppsala: if he respected the faith of the pagan Nordic mythology and the blót rituals at the Temple of Uppsala, he got to choose one county to have as Christian. He chose Västergötland, and in cooperation with the Archbishopric of Bremen, which was responsible for Apostolic Vicariate of the Nordic Missions, the Diocese of Skara was established, with first bishop appointed in 1014: Thurgot of Skara (dead circa 1030).

=== Ecclesiastical province of Lund (1104–1164) ===
In a Papal document from 1120, Skara was mentioned, Liunga kaupinga (Linköping), Tuna (Eskilstuna), Strängnäs, Sigtuna, and Arosa (Västerås or possibly Östra Aros/Uppsala), all as episcopal sees. Later in the 12th century, also Växjö and Åbo. Furthermore, Sigtuna was moved to Uppsala. The dioceses were from 1104 subject to the Archdiocese of Lund, which was then Danish.

During the 12th and 13th centuries, several religious orders were established throughout Sweden. Alvastra, Nydala and Varnhem abbeys were founded by the Cistercians. The Dominicans and the Franciscans opened convents in among other places Visby and Skara.

=== Ecclesiastical province of Uppsala (1164–1557) ===
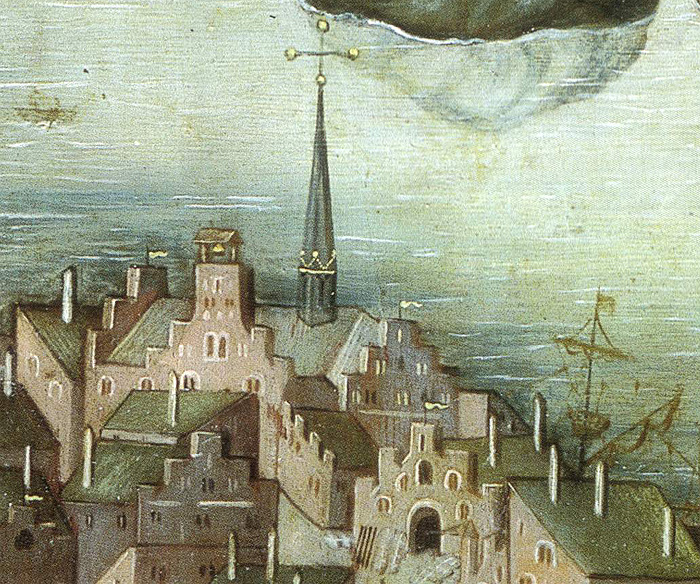
Black Friars' Monastery of Stockholm as illustrated in Vädersolstavlan (1535).

In 1164, Sweden was granted its own ecclesiastical province, with a proper archbishop seated in Uppsala. However, the ecclesiastical province of Sweden would still remain formally subject to Lund until the Protestant Reformation.

The most important figure of the church in Sweden during the 14th century was Bridget of Sweden. Her apparitions gained much renown both spiritually and politically throughout Europe. She managed to have the pope recognise the establishment of the Bridgettines order, and a convent was founded, Vadstena Abbey.

The Middle Ages also gave the Catholic Church in Sweden several saints. A few of them are still celebrated in the Catholic Church in Sweden today. Some of them are, besides Bridget, are Sigfrid of Sweden, and Helena of Skövde, but there were also local cults of for instance Catherine of Vadstena, Nils Hermansson, Ingrid of Skänninge, and Brynolf of Skara. See also: List of Swedish saints.

=== Protestant Reformation (16th century) ===
During the 16th century, King Gustav Vasa broke the relations with the pope, as did several northern European monarchies. The process had its background in the reformers' criticism of Catholicism, but it was also due to a larger societal context, including attempts to foster a centralised military state under more powerful royal control.

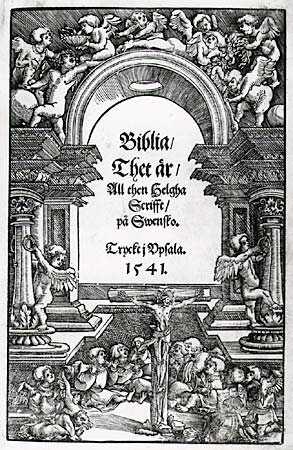
Gustav Vasa Bible.

Thus, the break with the Catholic Church and parts of its teachings, was due part to political/economical reasons, part to the theological reformation. Regarding the first, the conflict stood primarily at the Riksdag of Västerås in 1527, and the break with the pope through the abolition of the Canon law in 1536 under King Gustav Vasa.

However, these changes didn't mean that there were no more Catholics in Sweden during the 16th century. Naturally, there were plenty who during and after the Protestant Reformation didn't swap their loyalties so easy, yet didn't wish to leave the country. Throughout the modern era, immigrants arrived from Catholic countries who only reluctantly made superficial professions of Lutheranism, although some might have been described as crypto-Catholics.

Catholic authorities sent representatives illegally into the country and educated Swedes to become Catholic prelates outside of Sweden, despite that they could not legally return.

Exceptions from the Reformations occurred. The reigns of King John III and his son King Sigismund and the Swedish–Polish Union 1594–1599.

King John III attempted to ease the breach. He invited a Norwegian Jesuit, Laurentius Nicolai, who was active in Sweden 1576–1580. Later, two more Jesuits arrived who were active at the Collegium regium Stockholmense college on Riddarholmen in Stockholm. John III participated in Catholic eucharist and had extensive dialogue with the Holy See in Rome of having the Swedes returning to Catholicism, but these attempts were stranded. Nonetheless, his daughter married as Catholic.

After the Reformation, it took a long time for the Catholic Church to return to Sweden. Catholic clergy was present at some Catholic embassies, but their influence remained limited for obvious reasons; Sweden had Catholicism criminalised.

==== Uppsala Synod 1593 ====
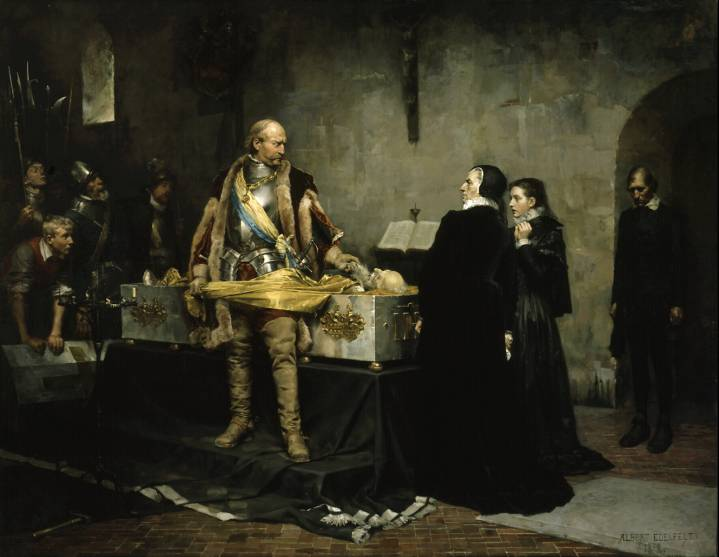
The regent duke Charles (later king Charles IX) insulting the corpse of Clas Eriksson Fleming in presence of the Dowager-Governor of Åbo, Ebba Stenbock, after the victory in the War against Sigismund. Albert Edelfelt's painting, 1878.

After the death of King John III in 1592, Duke Charles was appointed acting regent (Swedish: riksföreståndare). At the same time, the ideas of the Reformation were recognised along with the establishment of a national church in Sweden during the Uppsala Synod in 1593. At this point, the breach with the papacy was finally ratified. At this time in Sweden, politics was religion, and religion was politics, why the decision could be perceived as a provocative stance by the throne pretendent Duke against future King Sigismund and his supporters, which would eventually result in the War against Sigismund.

=== King Sigismund and the Swedish–Polish Union 1592–1599 ===
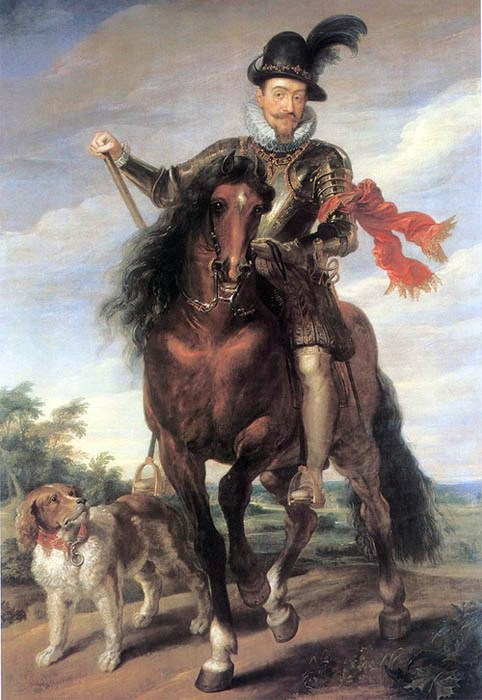
King Sigismund of Poland and Sweden attempted to unite the two countries under one Catholic kingdom

Due to the throne ascension of King Sigismund III and the establishment of the Swedish–Polish Union 1594-1599, the Protestant Reformation was halted, and religious freedom allowed. At this period, yet again Catholics were appointed to public offices and exiled Catholics were granted return or settlement.

=== Legally enforced anticatholicism 1599–1781 ===
Subsequent to Duke Charles victory in his War against Sigismund 1599, all Catholics were banned and exiled, enforced by death penalty.

After the death of King Charles IX in 1611, some legal suspensions were offered for ambassadors from Catholic countries and their relatives for them to live their faith, as for a few merchants and mercenaries. Now, immigrants from Catholic countries illegally partook in liturgies at the embassies. However, with the Riksdag of 1617, the rules were further restricted.

Yet, for Swedish Catholics, the death penalty was still imposed. For instance, in 1624, the Mayor Zackarias Anthelius and the royal secretary, Göran Bähr, both received the death penalty for converting to Roman Catholicism.

King Gustavus Adolphus' daughter and successor Queen Christina had Catholic clergy invited to her court. She abdicated from the throne and converted to the Catholic faith.

In the 1670s, Father Johannes Sterck, a Jesuit, was active in Sweden. He was originally a legation priest, but when the ambassador he served died, he stayed and initiated a mission instead. He was eventually sentenced to death, but the sentence was commuted and he was exiled.

In the 1720s, Catholic textile workers arrived, primarily from the Holy Roman Empire; these were granted limited freedom of religion. Their visits to the legation chapels were accepted behind closed doors in order to celebrate mass, and in this way these chapels evolved into small parishes. From this time, Catholics were termed "foreign religious adherents".

At this time, Catholics in Sweden were formally represented by the Apostolic Vicariate of the Nordic Missions.

=== Apostolic Vicariate in Sweden (1783–1953) ===
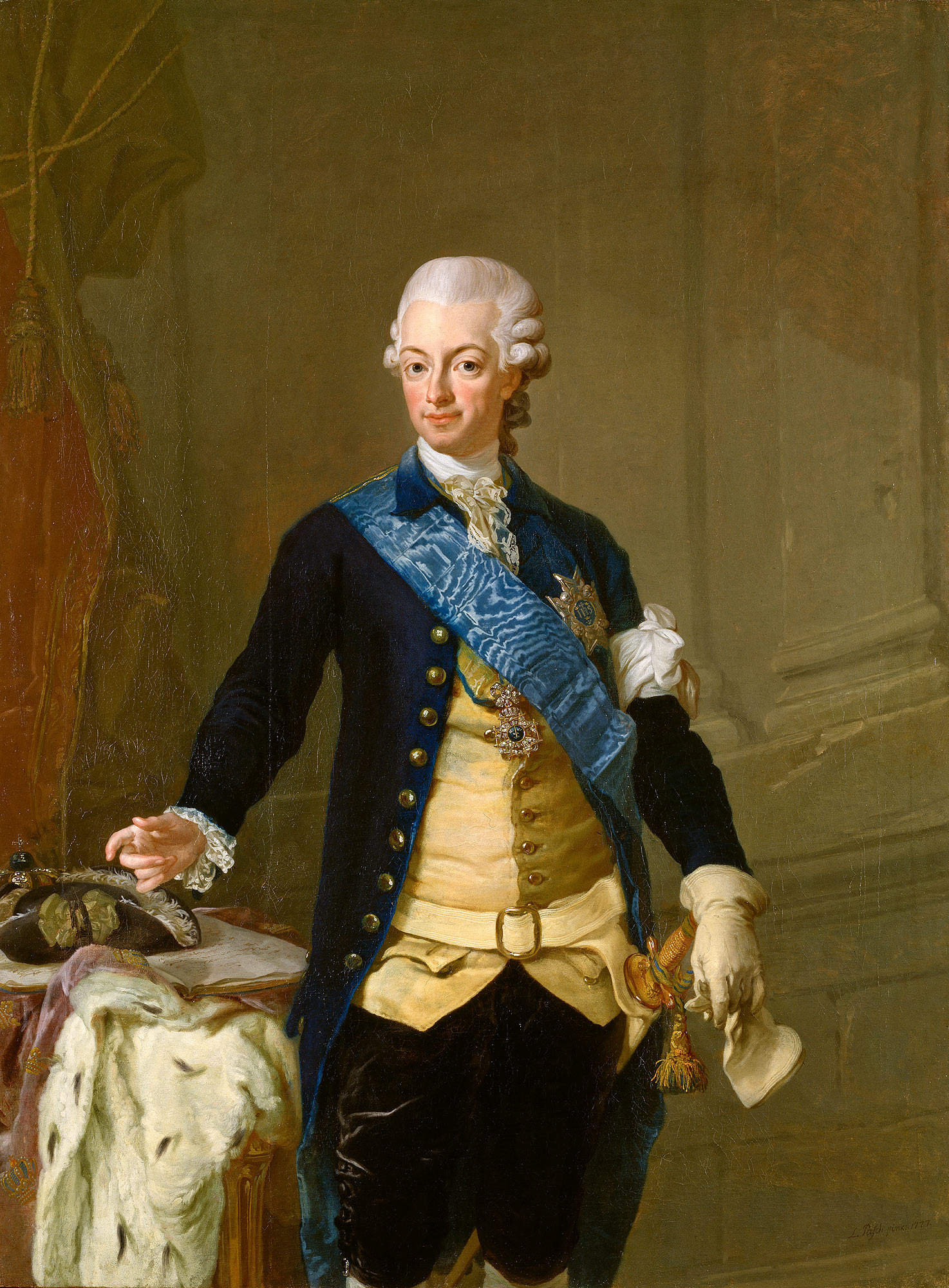
King Gustav III imposed the Tolerance Act in Sweden in 1781.

In 1781, King Gustav III imposed the Tolerance Act in Sweden, which gave foreign Catholics that had moved to Sweden the right to build churches and educate their issue in the Catholic tradition. First, an Apostolic prefecture was created, and in 1783 Pope Pius VI appointed a French priest, Father Nicolaus Oster, as apostolic vicar in Sweden, through which abbé Oster was recognised episcopal mandate. However, it would last some 100 years till before Swedish conversions became decriminalised.

In 1784, a Catholic parish was formally founded in Stockholm. The members lacked suitable premises, however. Therefore, until 1837, Stockholm's Catholics celebrated mass in the Freemasons hall inside the building of today's Stockholm City Museum, which they were offered to rent for the purposes.

After King Oscar I married a Catholic Princess, Josephine of Leuchtenberg, the restrictions against the Catholic Church in Sweden were further eased. The Queen brought with her a chaplain, Dr Jakobus Laurentius Studach. He was a consecrated bishop and became the new apostolic vicar for Sweden. At this time also the Chapel of Eugenia was erected at Norrmalm, which stood finished in 1837, but was demolished during the Redevelopment of Norrmalm in the 1960s.

Since 1873 it has been legal also for Sweden citizens to adhere to the Catholic Church without risking death penalty or exile. Civil rights were still restricted, however. Until 1951 it was forbidden for Catholics to become Members of Parliament, teachers, physicians, or nurses.

Dr. Albert Bitter was appointed apostolic vicar in 1893. In 1899 only some 2,500 Catholics in Sweden were registered. Catholic church buildings existed in Stockholm, Gothenburg, Malmö and Gävle. The psalm book Cecilia was published in 1902. In 1920, the first edition of the news and cultural magazine Credo was released, today known as Signum.

During and after World War II, the Catholic population increased due to refugees and immigrants. In 1946, the Catholic aid organisation Caritas Sweden was established to provide help for refugees both in Sweden and in the rest of Europe.

29 June 1953, Pope Pius XII established the Diocese of Stockholm. Sweden was no longer considered a missionary region, but enjoyed a more independent status. The same year, the Church of St. Eric was granted the status of cathedral. The first diocesan bishop was the former apostolic vicar Johannes Erik Müller, born in Bavaria. He was succeeded by Bishop Ansgar Nelson, a Benedictine monk, Bishop John Taylor, Oblates, and Bishop Hubertus Brandenburg, along with assistant bishop William Kenney.

== Diocese of Stockholm (since 1953) ==
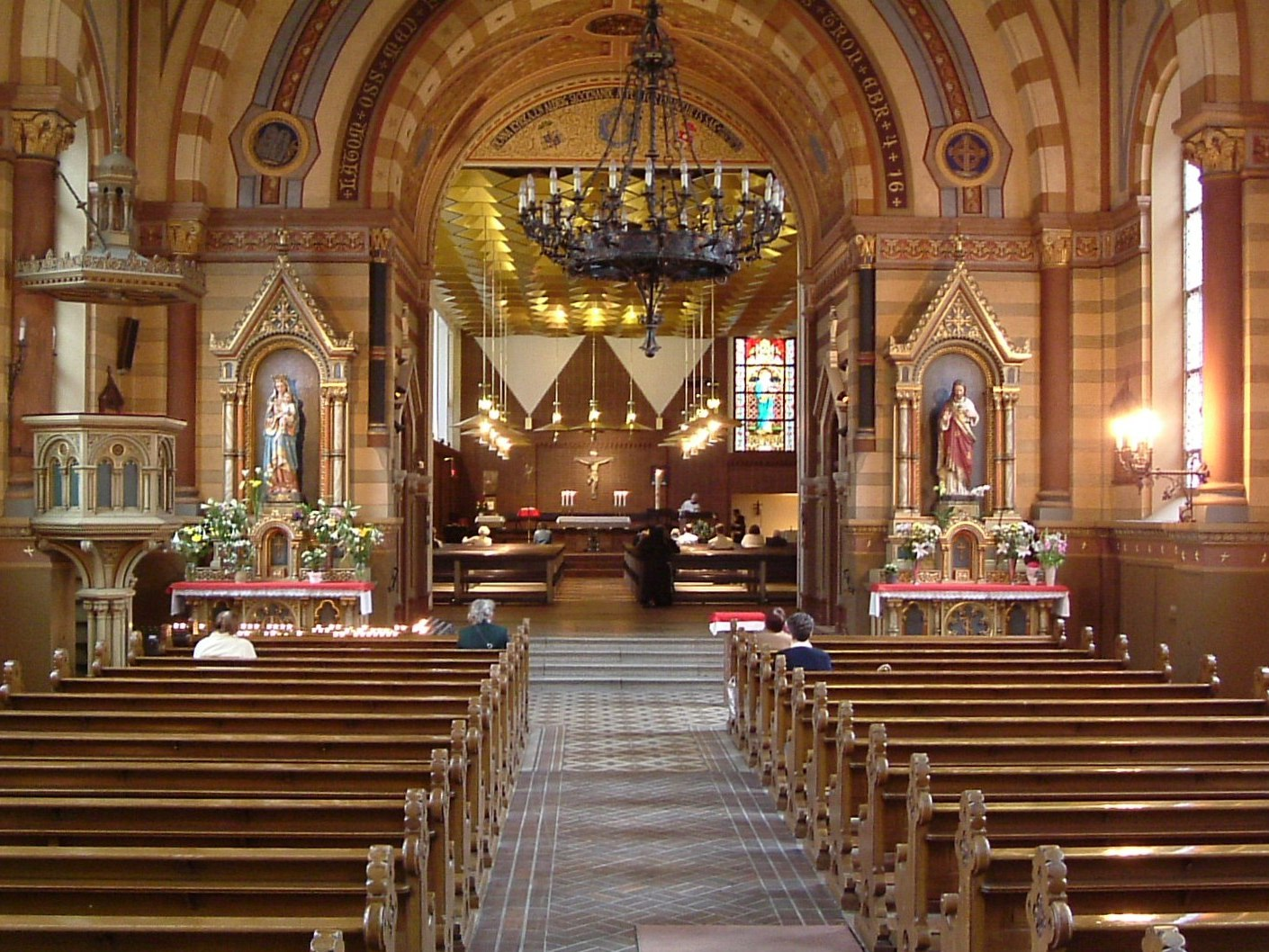
Interiors of the Cathedral of Saint Eric, Södermalm, Stockholm.

The Diocese of Stockholm, founded in 1953, covers all of Sweden's territory, has more than 100,000 members and is one of Sweden's largest religious denominations. In 1998, the Catholic Church in Sweden got its first Swedish bishop since the Protestant Reformation, Anders Arborelius. The cathedral of the diocese is the Cathedral of Saint Eric, located in Södermalm in Stockholm. Its parish has about 8,500 members.

Catholic priests are educated in Uppsala, with academic studies offered by the Newman Institute (Uppsala). A part of the studies may be pursued at the Pontifical universities in Rome. The education typically lasts a total of seven years, covering studies in philosophy, theology, pastoral practical work, as well as spiritual and liturgical instruction.

In 1934, the official youth association of the diocese was founded, Sveriges Unga Katoliker.

The central administration of the diocese maintains offices in Södermalm, in the real estate that was acquired in 1857. Furthermore, a Catholic school was founded at Nytorget in Södermalm in 1795. In 1859, the school moved to the diocese offices. In 1967 it moved to Enskede.

== Swedish saints and beatified ==
- Saint Botvid, Swedish missionary, martyr of 12th century.
- Saint Bridget of Sweden (1303–1373), Founder of the Order of the Most Holy Saviour (Bridgettines).
  - Canonized: October 7, 1391 by Pope Boniface IX
- Saint Catherine of Vadstena (1331–1381), Professed Religious of the Order of the Most Holy Saviour (Bridgettines).
  - Canonized: 1484 by Pope Innocent VIII
- Saint Maria Elisabetta Hesselblad (1870–1957), Founder of the Bridgettine Sisters; Revived the Order.
  - Beatified: April 9, 2000 by Pope John Paul II
  - Canonized: June 5, 2016 by Pope Francis
- Saint Ingrid of Skänninge, Dominican Nun
- Servant of God Ellen Ammann (1870–1932), Married Layperson of the Archdiocese of Munich-Freising; Founder of the German Catholic Women's Association.
- Servant of God Maria Caterina Flanagan (1892–1941), Professed Religious of the Bridgettine Sisters.
- Servant of God Stanislaw Komar (1882–1942), Professed Religious of the Jesuits; Martyr
- Servant of God Wilfried Stinissen of Christ the King (1927–2013), Professed Priest of the Discalced Carmelites

Worth mentioning is also Eric IX of Sweden (Locally referred to as "Saint Eric"), who was martyred and is venerated as a local saint, though never officially canonized by The Holy See.

== See also ==
- Religion in Sweden
- Church of Sweden
