= John the Baptist Catholic Church =

Catholic church and congregation in Landskrona, Sweden

Coordinates: 55°52′24.97″N 12°49′52.34″E

- Johannes Döparens katolska kyrka
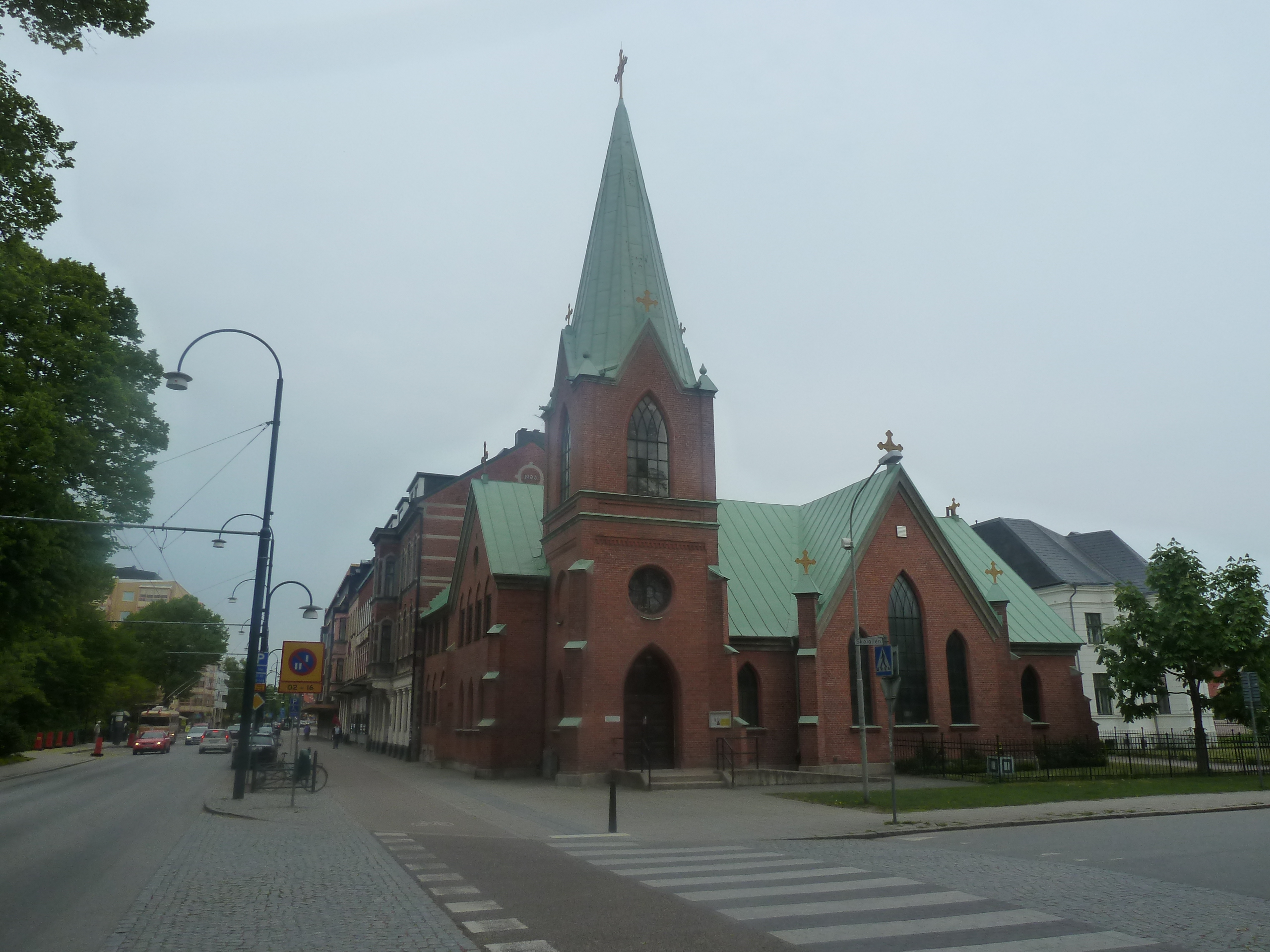
- The church as viewed from Eriksgatan
- John the Baptist Catholic Church
- Location: Eriksgatan 64; Landskrona Sweden
- Country: Sweden
- Denomination: Catholic Church
- Previous denomination: Methodism
- Website: S:t Johannes

History
- Founded: 1905 (1995)

Administration
- Diocese: Diocese of Stockholm

John the Baptist Catholic Church (Swedish: Johannes Döparens katolska kyrka) is a Catholic church and congregation in Landskrona, Sweden. The church was originally a Methodist church from its inauguration in 1905; but in 1995 the Roman Catholic church in Sweden acquired the church after the Methodist congregation had ceased its activity. The building was renovated to prepare for its reinauguration as a Catholic church.

During its time as a Methodist church, the name of the church building was the Betel Church (Swedish: Betelkyrkan). The inauguration in 1995 was officiated by the bishop Hubertus Brandenburg. In 2006 a major interior renovation took place, leading to the present appearance of the Neo-Gothic church room. Next to the crucifix, the choir has a sculpture of Mary with the baby Jesus on the left and the patron saint of the congregation and Landskrona City, Johannes the Baptist, as a sculpture on the left at the baptismal font.
