= Magnus Nyman =

Swedish historian and Roman Catholic priest

Magnus Nyman (born May 18, 1948) is a Swedish historian and a Roman Catholic priest.

== Biography ==
Nyman defended his thesis in 1988 in the history of ideas and learning at Uppsala University the thesis Press against freedom: Opinion formation in the Swedish newspapers and opinion breaks on minorities 1772–1786. His later research has, among other things, dealt with how the enlightenment was reported in Swedish press and about the Catholics' situation in Sweden during and after the Reformation. In addition to his academic career, Nyman has also worked as a priest, first in the Church of Sweden since 1973. In 1984 Nyman converted to the Catholic Church, in 2000 he became a deacon and in 2001 finally was ordained Roman Catholic priest. After his retirement from Uppsala University, he has worked as a professor and vice-rector at the Newman Institute.

Nyman was professor of history of ideas and learning at Uppsala University in 2001 and after his retirement from Uppsala University, he has worked as a professor and vice-rector at the Newman Institute.

Magnus Nyman is married to Margareta Murray-Nyman, daughter of Carl-Adolf Murray. They have four children.

== Sources ==
- Pressure against freedom: Opinion formation in the Swedish newspapers and opinion breaks on minorities 1772–1786, Uppsala University, 1988.
- The Mirror of Enlightenment: Götheborg's all-round about France and the world, 1774–1789, Atlantis, Stockholm, 1994.
- The losers' story: Catholic life in Sweden from Gustav Vasa to Queen Kristina, Catholic book publishing, Uppsala, 1997.
