= Jönköping Catholic Church =

- Jönköpings katolska kyrka
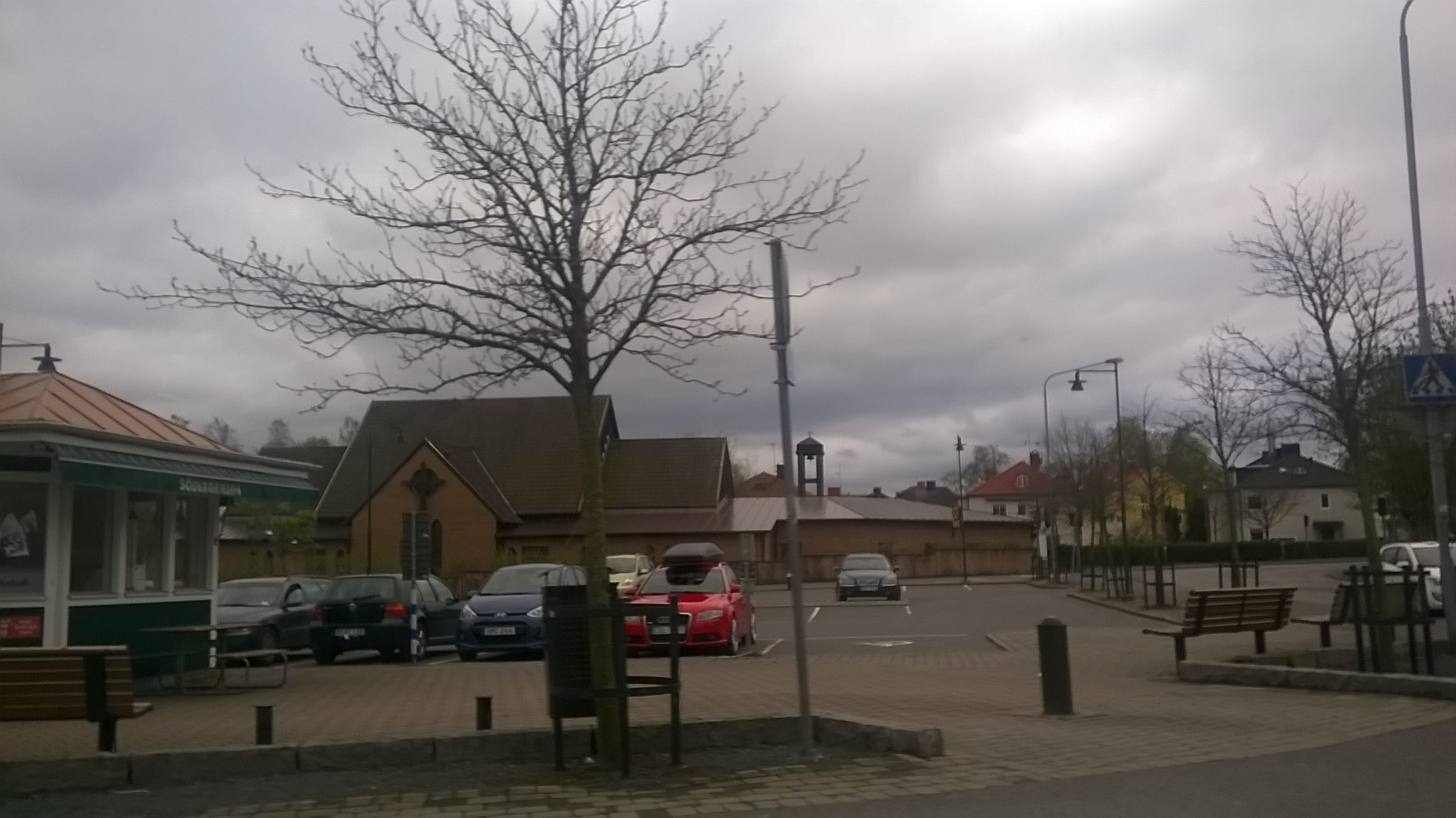
- Jönköping Catholic Church in May 2015

- Location within Jönköping Location within Sweden
- Jönköping Catholic Church
- 57°46′17″N 14°09′04″E
- Location: Jönköping
- Country: Sweden
- Denomination: Swedish Roman Catholic Church

History
- Consecrated: 30 November 1974

Administration
- Parish: Saint Francis

The Jönköping Catholic Church (Swedish: Jönköpings katolska kyrka) is a church building in Jönköping in Sweden. Belonging to the Swedish Roman Catholic Church, it was opened on 30 November 1974.
