= Knut Ansgar Nelson =

Catholic bishop (1906–1990)

His Excellency Knut Ansgar Nelson OSB
- Bishop of Stockholm
- Diocese: Roman Catholic Diocese of Stockholm
- See: Saint Eric's Cathedral, Stockholm
- Predecessor: Johannes Erik Müller
- Successor: John E. Taylor

Orders
- Ordination: 22 May 1937
- Consecration: 8 September 1947

Personal details
- Born: 1 October 1906 Frederiksværk, Denmark
- Died: 31 March 1990 (aged 83) Newport, Rhode Island
- Denomination: Roman Catholic (convert)
- Residence: Portsmouth Abbey; Stockholm

Knut Ansgar Nelson (1 October 1906 – 31 March 1990) was a Danish-born convert to Roman Catholicism who served as bishop of Stockholm from 1957 to 1962.

== Life ==
Nelson was born in 1906 in Frederiksværk, Denmark, but travelled to the United States in 1925. He became a Catholic while working in Salem, Massachusetts and studying medieval art. In May 1931 he entered Portsmouth Priory, Rhode Island, making his solemn profession in 1935. He was ordained a priest on 22 May 1937.

During his early years in the monastery he taught classics in what was then still Portsmouth Priory School. After his retirement he provided philosophy seminars in the novitiate and for the more advanced students in the school.

On 11 August 1947 he was appointed coadjutor Vicar Apostolic of Sweden, as titular bishop of Bilta (Tunisia), and consecrated bishop by Amleto Giovanni Cicognani, Apostolic Delegate to the United States, on 8 September the same year, at a ceremony in the Cathedral of Saints Peter and Paul, Providence, Rhode Island.

In 1951 he visited Duane Garrison Hunt in Salt Lake City, and on that occasion was interviewed about the impact of Soviet policy on the state of Christianity in Scandinavia.

When Stockholm became an independent diocese in 1953, Nelson became coadjutor bishop. He succeeded to the bishopric on 1 October 1957, resigning on 2 July 1962. After his retirement he served as a chaplain to nuns in Switzerland for five years before returning to Portsmouth Abbey.

In retirement, he was titular bishop of Dura.

Nelson died in Newport Hospital, Newport, Rhode Island on 31 March 1990.

== Commemoration ==
In 1996 a scholarship endowment at Portsmouth Abbey School was established as the "Bishop Ansgar Nelson O.S.B. Memorial Fund".
