= Diocese of Stockholm =

Diocese of Stockholm (Swedish: Stockholms stift) may refer to:

- Church of Sweden Diocese of Stockholm
- Roman Catholic Diocese of Stockholm
