= William Kenney (bishop) =

English Roman Catholic bishop (born 1946)

The Right Reverend William Leonard Kenney C.P.
- Auxiliary Bishop Emeritus of Birmingham
- Church: Catholic Church
- Archdiocese: Birmingham
- Appointed: 17 October 2006
- Term ended: 7 May 2021
- Other posts: Titular Bishop of Midica (since 1987), Diocesan Administrator of Birmingham (2009)
- Previous post: Auxiliary Bishop of Stockholm (1987–2006)

Orders
- Ordination: 29 June 1969 by George Dwyer
- Consecration: 24 August 1987 by Hubertus Brandenburg

Personal details
- Born: 7 May 1946 (age 80) Newcastle upon Tyne, England
- Education: University of Växjö, University of Gothenburg, London School of Economics

William Leonard Kenney, C.P. (born 7 May 1946) is an English Roman Catholic prelate who served as an auxiliary bishop of the Diocese of Stockholm from 1987 to 2006 and as an auxiliary bishop of the Archdiocese of Birmingham from 2006 until his retirement in 2021. His titular see has been Midica since 1987.

== Early life and education ==
William Kenney was born on 7 May 1946 in Newcastle upon Tyne, England, and was raised in Birmingham in the parish of Saints Mary and John, Gravelly Hill. He attended St Philip's Grammar School in Edgbaston. He entered the Passionist congregation, making his religious profession in 1963, and was ordained to the priesthood on 29 June 1969 by George Dwyer. After he studied sociology and psychology at the University of Växjö and the University of Gothenburg and pursuing doctoral studies at the London School of Economics from 1977 to 1979. Then he lectured in the Sociology of Religion and was Director of Studies at the Department of Religious Studies in the University of Gothenburg between 1979 and 1982 and from 1984 to 1987.

== Episcopal ministry ==
On 13 May 1987, Pope John Paul II appointed Kenney auxiliary bishop of the Diocese of Stockholm and titular bishop of Midica. He received episcopal consecration on 24 August 1987 from Hubertus Brandenburg.

During his years in Sweden he was active in Catholic charitable and ecumenical work. From 1991 to 1999 he served as chairman of Caritas Europa and vice-president of Caritas Internationalis. He later became a member of the Legal Affairs Commission of Caritas Internationalis and represented bishops' conferences within the Commission of the Bishops' Conferences of the European Union (COMECE).

On 17 October 2006, Pope Benedict XVI appointed Kenney auxiliary bishop of Birmingham. He served as area bishop for Coventry, Oxfordshire and Warwickshire and was elected diocesan administrator of the Archdiocese of Birmingham in 2009 following the transfer of Archbishop Vincent Nichols.

Kenney has been involved extensively in ecumenical dialogue, particularly with the Lutheran churches. In 2018 he was appointed Catholic co-president of the International Lutheran–Catholic Commission on Unity.

On 7 May 2021, Pope Francis accepted Kenney's resignation upon reaching the canonical retirement age of 75.

== Recognition ==
In 2019, Kenney celebrated the silver jubilee of his episcopal ministry in Birmingham, marking 25 years since the beginning of his episcopal service.
