= Dissenter Acts (Sweden) =

Swedish laws regarding religion

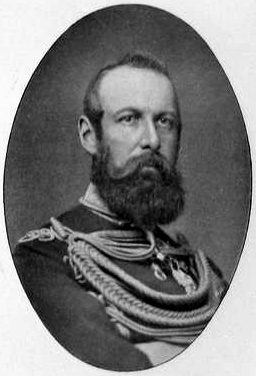
Karl XV before his death in 1872.

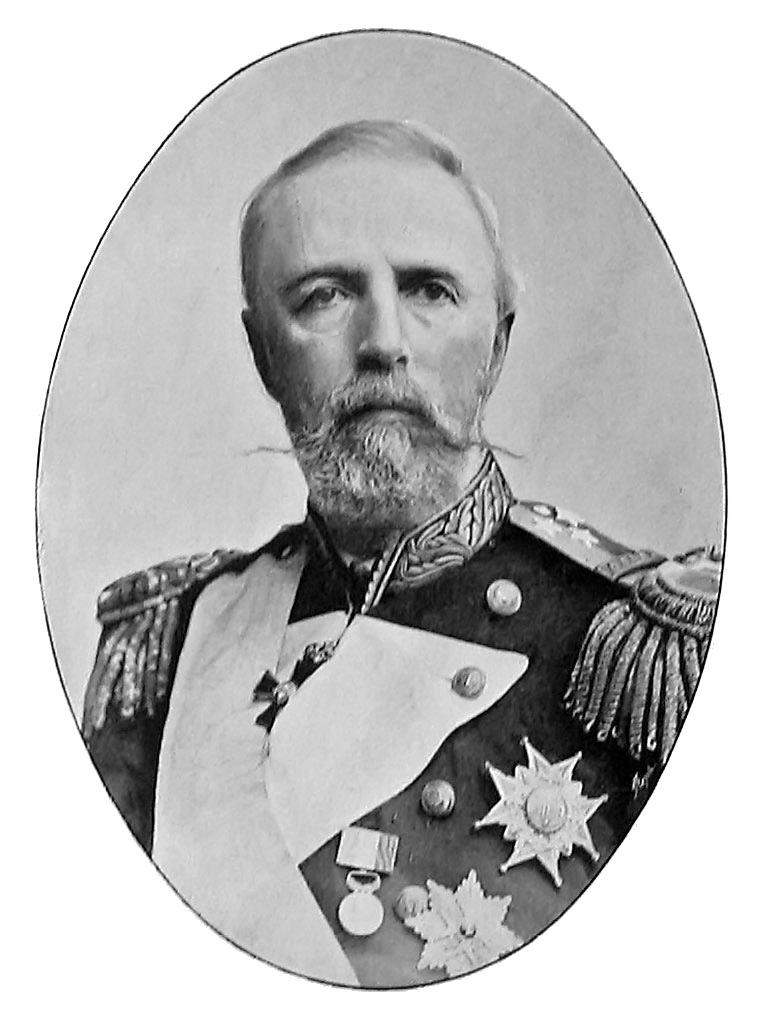
Oscar II in a pre-1900 photograph.

Dissenter Acts (Swedish: Dissenterlagarna) were laws, enacted by the King of Sweden with the consent of the Swedish Parliament, which gave nonconformists who wanted to leave the then established Church of Sweden the right to do so, provided that the dissenters then joined one of the state-approved denominations. The first such edict was decreed in 1860 by Karl XV and the Ståndsriksdag; the second one in 1873 by Oscar II and the reorganized bicameral Riksdag. Neither the Ståndsriksdag, divided into four Estates, nor the newer Riksdag could be said to be truly democratic, though, as the suffrage was restricted to males who owned property. The 1873 edict remained in force until the 1951 Religious Freedom Act (religionsfrihetslag); the Church of Sweden remained the established state church until 2000.

Despite the enactment of the Dissenter Acts, nonconformists were still required to financially support the then established Church of Sweden:

The state religion is the Evangelical Lutheran doctrine, in the sense that the churches which have concurred in this creed are described as a state church, placed under the king's (government's) "supervision, care and defence," for which the state so defines its constitution and economy that the King and his Cabinet Council determines the religion. This religion is taught in state schools and has special constitutional protection; furthermore, its clergy constitute an Estate of the realm. There shall be a Board of Education to which the king will appoint church officials. Holidays of the state church shall be respected even by adherents of foreign creeds, who also must contribute to its expenses. The king and parliament participate in the establishment of canon law; the king establishes the church bylaws. It has even happened that His Royal Majesty has contributed government funds to reward preachers who have countered heterodox dissenters. The king is summus episcopus (archbishop), the Church's head and governor (cujus est regio, illius est religio, "The religion of a country is that of its ruler"), with a territorial system as opposed to hierarchical and self-governing systems.

== Edicts ==
- Förordning angående främmande trosbekännare och deras religionsöfning (Edict concerning adherents of foreign creeds and their exercise of religion, 1860)
- Konglig Förordning ang främmande trosbekännare och deras religionsöfning den 31 oktober 1873 (Royal Edict of October 31, 1873 re adherents of foreign creeds and their religious worship)

== See also ==
- Conventicle Act (Sweden)
- Tolerance Act (Sweden)
- Dissenter Act (Norway)
