= Caritas Sweden =

Swedish Catholic aid organisation

- Caritas Sverige

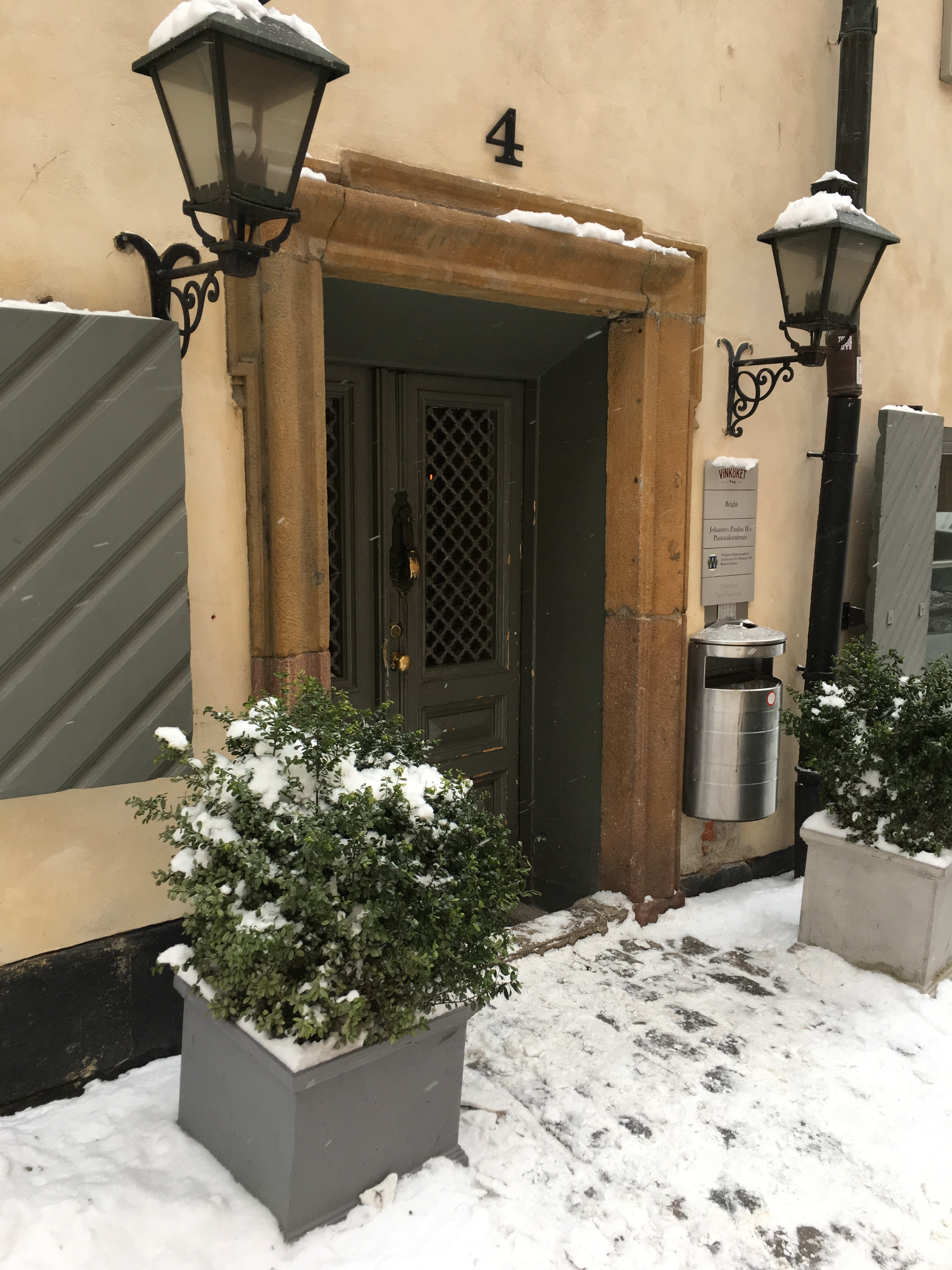
- Established: 23 February 1946; 80 years ago
- Type: Nonprofit
- Purpose: development aid, social services
- Location: Stockholm, Sweden
- Coordinates: 59.3250°N 18.07444°E
- Region served: Sweden
- Affiliations: Caritas Europa, Caritas Internationalis
- Website: www.caritas.se

Caritas Sweden (Swedish: Caritas Sverige) is a Catholic aid organisation from Sweden. It is part of the European network of Caritas organisations Caritas Europa, as well of the global confederation Caritas Internationalis.

== History and work ==
=== The beginning ===
After World War II, Caritas Sweden was founded in 1946 by Bishop Johannes Erik Müller. Sweden had been spared from destruction and many refugees arrived in the country. Caritas sent aid abroad, mainly to Germany, but also to France, Hungary, Poland and Austria. In 1946 alone, Caritas Sweden sent 350,000 kilos of goods to Germany. Many refugees also arrived in Sweden. In 1950, Caritas Sweden opened a counselling office in Stockholm for the many refugees who sought help from the Catholic Church. At the same time, its international aid efforts were directed to Eastern Europe, where Stalin's hardening religious policy created great difficulties for the Catholics behind the Iron Curtain.

=== Development as aid agency and downfall ===
In 1987, Caritas Sweden was established under its current modern form and became a full member of the global Caritas confederation, Caritas Internationalis, as well as part of its regional cooperation organization Caritas Europa.

It developed into an aid organisation that supported countries in the global South through various development projects. The objective of the organisation was to contribute to a more just world where poor and marginalised people are empowered. Caritas Sweden established a cooperation with the Swedish International Development Cooperation Agency (SIDA) and the Swedish Mission Council (Svenska missionsrådet), quickly growing as a development actor. Over time, the international aid work became more specialised, focussing on HIV/AIDS, human rights, and democracy issues, with a particular emphasis on the situation of women. By the early 2000s, Caritas Sweden was supporting partners with projects in more than 50 countries and with a budget of around 100 million SEK per year. This rapid growth brought challenges, and the staff were unable to fulfil the tasks assigned to them.

In 2005, Caritas Sweden initiated an investigation to examine its projects in the Middle East from 2002 to 2004 due to indications that not everything was in order. The investigation revealed serious shortcomings in the management of procedures and rules for contracts, as well as inadequate follow-up and reporting of the projects. This was reported to the Caritas Board in January 2006. SIDA decided to carry out in-depth investigations, which showed similar results. Consequently, SIDA demanded the repayment of a large sum of funds and froze any new applications. As a result, the leadership of the Catholic diocese decided shut down Caritas Sweden as an association, including all overseas development activities. All activities were taken over by the Roman Catholic Church in autumn 2007.

Before this controversy, Caritas Sweden had expanded its work within Sweden, providing counselling and support for refugees and asylum seekers, and engaging in advocacy work both nationally and within the EU on refugee issues and human trafficking. The mission was to raise awareness of aid and development issues and to promote development through aid. Caritas Sweden was tasked with coordinating social pastoral work in the Catholic diocese. An important part of this was the creation of a volunteer programme in the Catholic parishes. Local Caritas groups visited the elderly and sick, organised soup kitchens for the homeless, and arranged activities for the lonely.

In 2011, Caritas Sweden rejoined the Caritas Internationalis confederation.

=== A new focus on work in Sweden since 2013 ===
In 2013, Caritas Sweden formally became a body of the Diocese of Stockholm, which covers all of Sweden. At the express wish of the bishop, Cardinal Anders Arborelius, great importance was placed on supporting and encouraging the Catholic parishes to build up their own charitable work at the local level. This entails strengthening capacities in the parishes and coordinating the support they give to those in need. Caritas Sweden also runs a meeting place in Stockholm (Mötesplats Caritas), where refugees, migrants, asylum seekers, and other vulnerable people can benefit from Swedish lessons, legal counselling on migration, and human support.

In parallel, Caritas Sweden continues to engage in advocacy work to defend the human dignity and rights of migrants, asylum seekers, and refugees, and fights against human trafficking. From 2018 to 2020, Caritas Sweden was a partner in the DG DEVCO–funded project Migration, Interconnectedness, Development (MIND), which aimed to raise awareness of the relationship between migration and development.

Caritas Sweden also coordinates the efforts of its volunteers, who implement activities such as collecting clothes, distributing food, and running language classes. Since 2021, Caritas Sweden has maintained a network for young people, Caritas Ungdom. Today, this network is active in several places in Sweden, and its members carry out various tasks, including collecting money, clothes, and food for the needy, visiting homes for the elderly and the Swedish Migration Agency's residences, organising activities for mothers and children, and assisting with church coffee in the local parish.

== Literature ==
- Mai-Brith Schartau, ed. (1999). Caritas: En organisation i förändring (PDF). Schwedische Perspektiven. Schriften des Zentrums für Deutschlandsstudien 6 (in Swedish). Södertörn University. ISBN 978-91-97466-25-7. ISSN 1651-8209.
