= Midica =

Africa Proconsularis, (125 AD)

The Diocese of Midica (in Latin: Dioecesis Midicensis) is a suppressed venue and head office of the Catholic Church. Midica, near Sfax in today's Tunisia, is an ancient episcopal seat of the province of Byzacena.

The only known bishop of this African diocese is the Donatist bishop Mark, who took part in the 411 Carthaginian conference, between the Catholic and Donatist bishops. The seat on that occasion had no Catholic bishops.

Today Midica survives as a titular bishopric and the current bishop is Leonard William Kenney, auxiliary bishop of Birmingham.
