= Wilfrid Stinissen =

Wilfrid Stinissen OCD (1927 – 30 November 2013) was a Belgian Carmelite priest and devotional author.

== Life ==
Stinissen was born in Belgium in 1927, and by age 16 was determined to become a Catholic monk.

Stinissen joined the Carmelites in 1944. After ordination, he earned a doctorate in philosophy, and went on to teach history of philosophy and psychology of religion at a Carmelite seminary. In 1967 he was sent to help found the Carmelite monastery in Norraby, near Tågarp, Sweden, where he lived until his death. Stinissen rarely left the monastery, but began publishing devotional books in 1980.

Stinissen was the spiritual director of Anders Arborelius while Arborelius was a novice.

In 2013, Stinissen died in his sleep after a short illness.

== Works ==
- Hör du vinden blåsa? En bok om den helige Ande (Libris Förlag, 1989), published in English as The Holy Spirit, Fire of Divine Love (Ignatius Press, 2017, trans. Clare Marie)
