= Collegium regium Stockholmense =

Collegium Stockholmense
- Latin: Collegium regium Stockholmense
- Active: 1576–1593
- Founders: John III of Sweden
- Religious affiliation: Jesuits (circa 1576-1583)
- Location: Stockholm, Sweden
- Campus: Urban

The Collegium Regium Stockholmense (the "King's College of Stockholm", but most commonly called just Collegium regium or sometimes Collegium Stockholmense) was an institution of higher, mostly theological, education founded by King John III of Sweden in 1576 and functioned until 1593.

Married to a Polish princess, John III had Roman Catholic leanings, and the college, which was to train clergymen, was located to the old Franciscan monastery on Riddarholmen, and employed Jesuit teachers, such as Laurentius Nicolai. As the king's enthusiasm for Roman Catholicism waned from about 1580, larger number of Protestant teachers started to be employed, especially during the years 1583–1587. When Uppsala University, which had been suppressed by the king during the 1580s, was reopened in 1593, the remaining professors of the college were transferred to the university.

The professors at the college included the later archbishop Petrus Kenicius (1555–1636).
