= Newman Institute (Uppsala) =

Coordinates: 59.8561°N 17.6379°E

- Newmaninstitutet
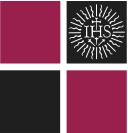
- Type: Private, Roman-Catholic (Jesuit)
- Established: 2001
- Rector: Philip Geister SJ
- Students: c. 180
- Location: Uppsala, Sweden
- Website: www.newman.se

The Newman Institute for Catholic Studies is a university college offering courses in theology, philosophy, and cultural studies. The institute was inspired by the English philosopher, writer and cardinal John Henry Newman (1801–1890), and was founded in 2001. It is located in Uppsala and is run by the Society of Jesus; the current rector is Philip Geister SJ. In 2010, the Newman Institute was accredited by the Swedish Higher Education Authority.

== Education ==
Since 2008, the Newman Institute has offered a three-year Bachelor's degree program (180 credits), which combines theology with philosophy and cultural studies. A Higher Education Diploma in theology is also available, which comprises 120 credits. Individual courses are available to students, and are offered in a wide range of fields, including theology, philosophy, literature, art, ecclesiastical architecture, music, and film.

The teaching staff at the Newman Institute consists of about 25 adjunct and full-time teachers. Courses are normally conducted in Swedish, but a few are offered in English each term, and the primary location for lectures is the Newman Building in Uppsala. Each term some courses are also offered in Stockholm, Gothenburg, and Vadstena. In 2007, the Newman Institute started providing the fundamental philosophical and theological training for the Catholic priest candidates of Sweden.

The institute collaborates with many other academic institutions both in Sweden and internationally. Each term a number of individual courses are offered jointly with Uppsala University's Department of Theology or Department of Musicology. Collaboration agreements have been established with Menighetsfakultetet in Oslo (the largest theological faculty in Norway), Philosophisch-theologische Hochschule Sankt Georgen in Frankfurt, Università Pontificia Gregoriana in Rome, Boston College in the US, among others. The institute has established Erasmus Programme partnerships with theological faculties in England, Ireland, Germany, the Netherlands, Norway, Poland, and Ukraine.

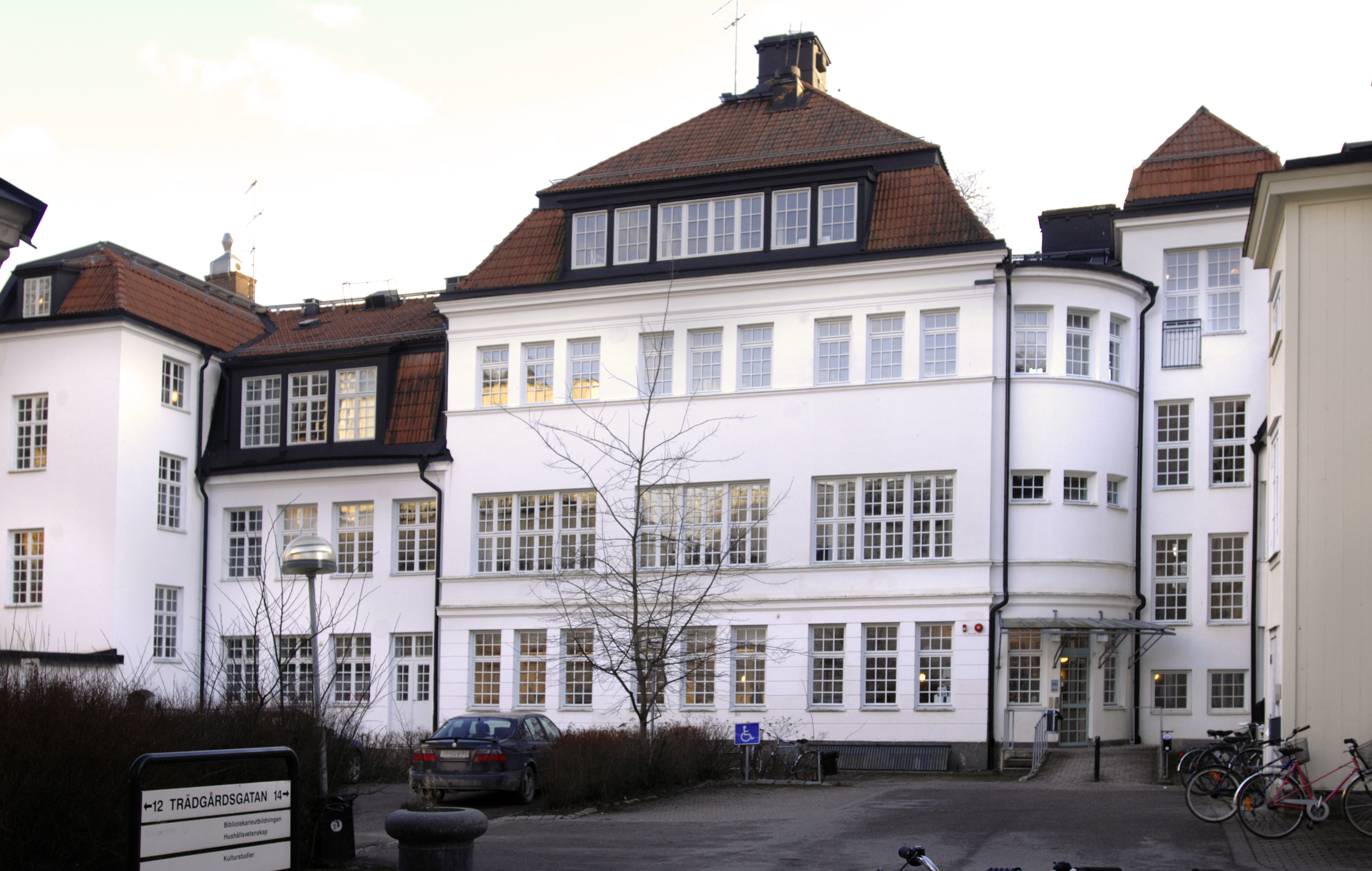
Newman Institute Uppsala

== The Newman Building ==
In 2006, the Newman Institute acquired its main building, situated in the center of Uppsala, one block from the Catholic parish church and just a few blocks from the main buildings of Uppsala University and Uppsala Cathedral. The Newman Building is renovated and contains a library with about 5,000 titles in the areas of theology, philosophy, and cultural studies. In 2009 a new wing was added to the Newman Building to house St. Sigfrid's Seminary of the Stockholm Catholic diocese.

== Signum Magazine ==
The Catholic cultural magazine Signum, edited by the Newman Institute, covers a broad spectrum of issues concerning faith, culture, research, and society. The printed version of Signum is published eight times per year. In addition, there is an up-to-date website containing an article archive dating from 1975 to the present.

== See also ==
- List of Jesuit sites
