= Laurentius Nicolai =

Norwegian Jesuit

Laurids Nilsen (Swedish: Lars Nilsson, Latin: Laurentius Nicolai Norvegus), known in Sweden as Kloster-Lasse ("Monestary-Lars"), born 1538 in Tønsberg, Denmark–Norway, dead 1622 in Vilnius, Lithuania, was a Norwegian Jesuit, active in service of the Counter-Reformation in Sweden during the reign of King John III of Sweden from 1576 until 1588. During that time, he headed the Roman Catholic Collegium Regium Stockholmense.
