= Portsmouth Abbey =

Benedictine monastery in Portsmouth, Rhode Island, United States

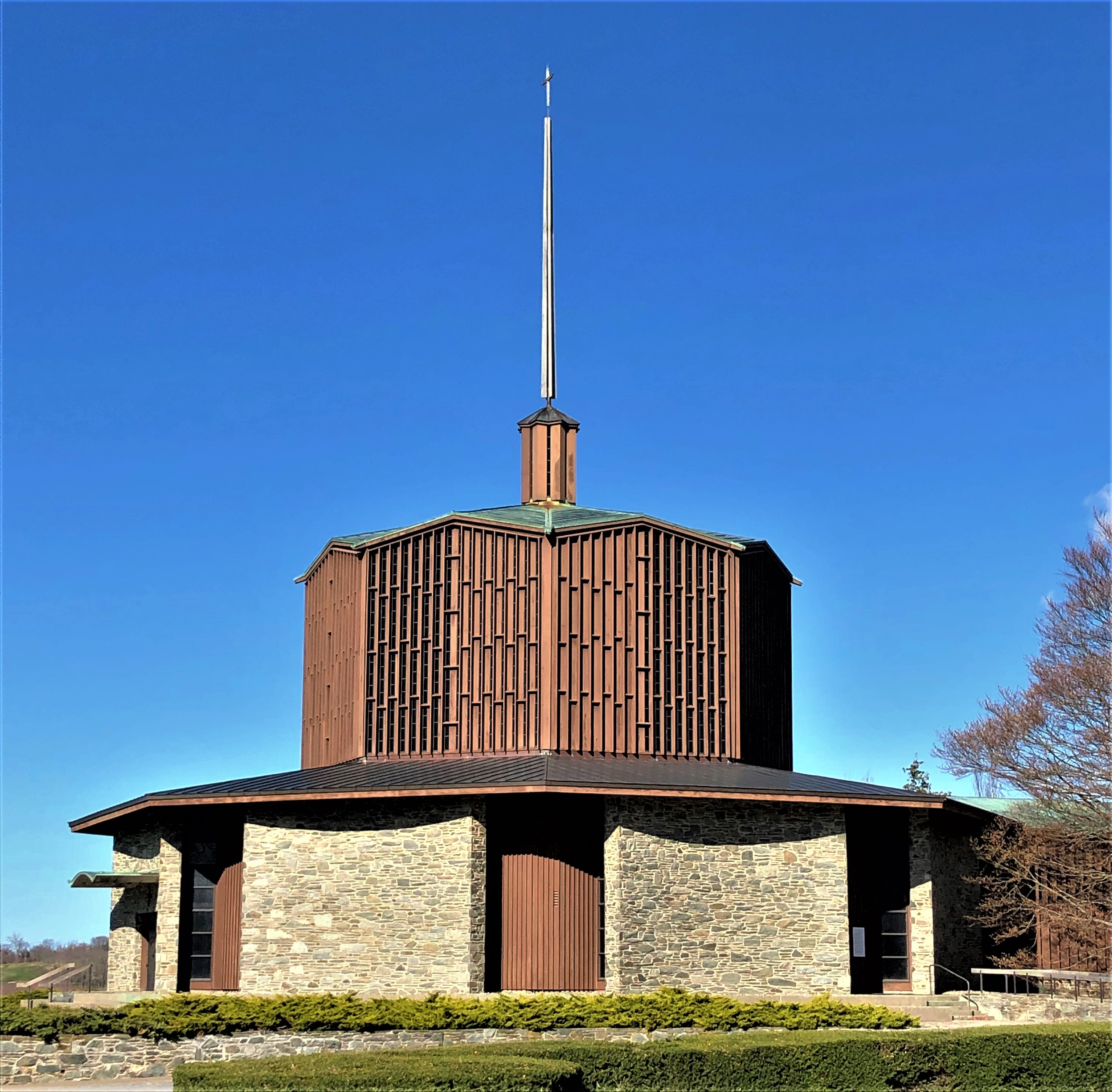

- Location within Rhode Island Location within the United States
- Interactive map of Portsmouth Abbey

Monastery information
- Order: Benedictines
- Established: 1918
- Mother house: Downside Abbey
- Dedication: St. Gregory the Great; Mary, Queen of Peace
- Diocese: Diocese of Providence

People
- Prior: Rev. Father Michael Brunner, O.S.B.
- Bishop: Most Rev. Thomas Joseph Tobin
- Important associated figures: Founders: Dom Leonard Sargent

Architecture
- Functional status: abbey
- Architect: Pietro Belluschi

Site
- Location: 285 Cory’s Lane; Portsmouth, RI 02871
- Coordinates: 41°36′12″N 71°16′19″W
- Website: portsmouthabbeymonastery.org

Portsmouth Abbey is a Benedictine monastery in Portsmouth, on Aquidneck Island in Narragansett Bay, Rhode Island, United States. As of 2025, the abbey has 10 monks. The monks run Portsmouth Abbey School.

== History and description ==
The monastery was founded in 1918 as Portsmouth Priory by Dom Leonard Sargent, an American monk of Downside Abbey in England. In keeping with the congregation’s early history, the monks run a college preparatory boarding school for boys and girls. The monks also focused on scholarly and artistic work, and hospitality, as well as helping local parishes.

The English Benedictine Congregation (EBC), of which Portsmouth Abbey is a member, is the oldest of the Benedictine congregations. It has canonical continuity with the first congregation established in the 13th century by the Holy See. The monks of the EBC run schools attached to their monasteries and look after 27 small parishes and mass centers near them. In addition, 30 parishes and 14 mass centers in England and Wales are served by EBC monks. A tradition revived by Fr Augustine Baker in the early 1600s laid great emphasis on contemplative and mystical prayer. This tradition continues in the EBC and at Portsmouth Abbey today.
