= Tolerance Act (Sweden) =

Swedish law regarding religion

The Tolerance Act (Swedish: Toleransediktet) was a Swedish law, enacted by Gustav III of Sweden 24 January 1781. It guaranteed freedom of religion and full citizen rights for all Christian immigrants and foreign residents in Sweden.

== Background ==
Since the Uppsala Synod of 1593, Lutheranism had officially been the only religion allowed in Sweden, though the foreign embassies were given dispensation, as well as other foreigners temporarily residing in the country. The Tolerance Act was introduced in line with the ideals of the Age of Enlightenment. There was also an economic motivation, namely, that religious toleration would make it easier for foreigners to work in Sweden. This was the point of view of Anders Chydenius when he presented his motion on the issue at the 1779 Riksdag. "Touched by the misfortunes of my fellow citizens and sensitive to the growth and strength of my native country, I have expressed my thoughts," he said. "The prejudices that seek to exterminate villagers by force of conscience and persecution are, thank God, long since dispelled." According to Chydenius, freedom of religion did not have to pose a threat to the Lutheran faith. He cited several examples that would have a reassuring effect: "Denmark is not Jewish, even though these unfortunate people there live in peace and visit their synagogues in public."

The clergy rejected the proposal at the Riksdag of the Estates, but the issue was settled by the approval of the other three estates.

According to the act, Christian immigrants were to have free and unrestricted religious practice and civil, but not full political, rights. They were also guaranteed the right to bring up their children in their faith. However, the immigrants were denied access to state offices and parliamentary rights. Nor were they allowed to hold public processions, establish public schools or monasteries, or engage in any kind of proselytizing. No monks were allowed to enter the country, "of whatever religion or sect they may be".

Anyone who insulted the worship of foreigners or blasphemed their doctrines and practices was to be punished with a fine. If the priests of the state church were called upon to visit ill immigrants, they were not allowed to trouble their consciences with religious disputes and controversies.

The new law earned Gustav III a letter of thanksgiving from Pope Pius VI, and the king responded by expressing his joy at having won the approval of such an enlightened ruler.

The act was followed in 1782 by the Judereglementet ('The Jewish Regulations'), which guaranteed freedom of religion specifically for Jewish immigrants. This legislation was a step toward full freedom of religion in Sweden. However, it only applied to immigrants and foreigners, while the Lutheran Swedish citizens were still restricted in their practice of religion by the Conventicle Act (konventikelplakatet).

The Tolerance Act was replaced by the Dissenter Acts from 1860 and 1873, which made it legal for a Swedish citizen to leave the established Lutheran church and join another officially recognised denomination, but conversion to one of the so-called foreign religious communities was still hedged about by strong restrictions.

Similar reforms were made elsewhere in Enlightenment Europe, such as the Patent of Toleration in 1781 in Joseph II's Austria, and were a fundamental idea in the United States Constitution. However, the Declaration of Indulgence in 1672 and the Toleration Act in 1689 in England had a different background.

The Conventicle Act remained in place for native Swedes until 1858, which completely restricted their freedom of worship outside of that of the Church of Sweden whose status was regulated by law as a state church The final act was the law of 1951, which allowed for complete freedom of conscience by allowing citizens to renounce or abandon one religious confession without replacing it with another, thereby formally also legalizing atheism.

== See also ==
- Religion in Sweden
