= John Edward Taylor (bishop) =

American bishop (1914–1976)

His Excellency John Edward Taylor O.M.I.
- Bishop of Stockholm
- Church: Roman Catholic
- Diocese: Stockholm
- Appointed: July 2, 1962
- In office: 1962–1976
- Predecessor: Knut Ansgar Nelson
- Successor: Hubertus Brandenburg

Orders
- Ordination: May 25, 1940
- Consecration: September 21, 1962 by Bruno Heim
- Rank: Bishop

Personal details
- Born: November 15, 1914 East St. Louis, Illinois, United States
- Died: September 9, 1976 (aged 61)
- Motto: Evangelizare misit me
- Coat of arms

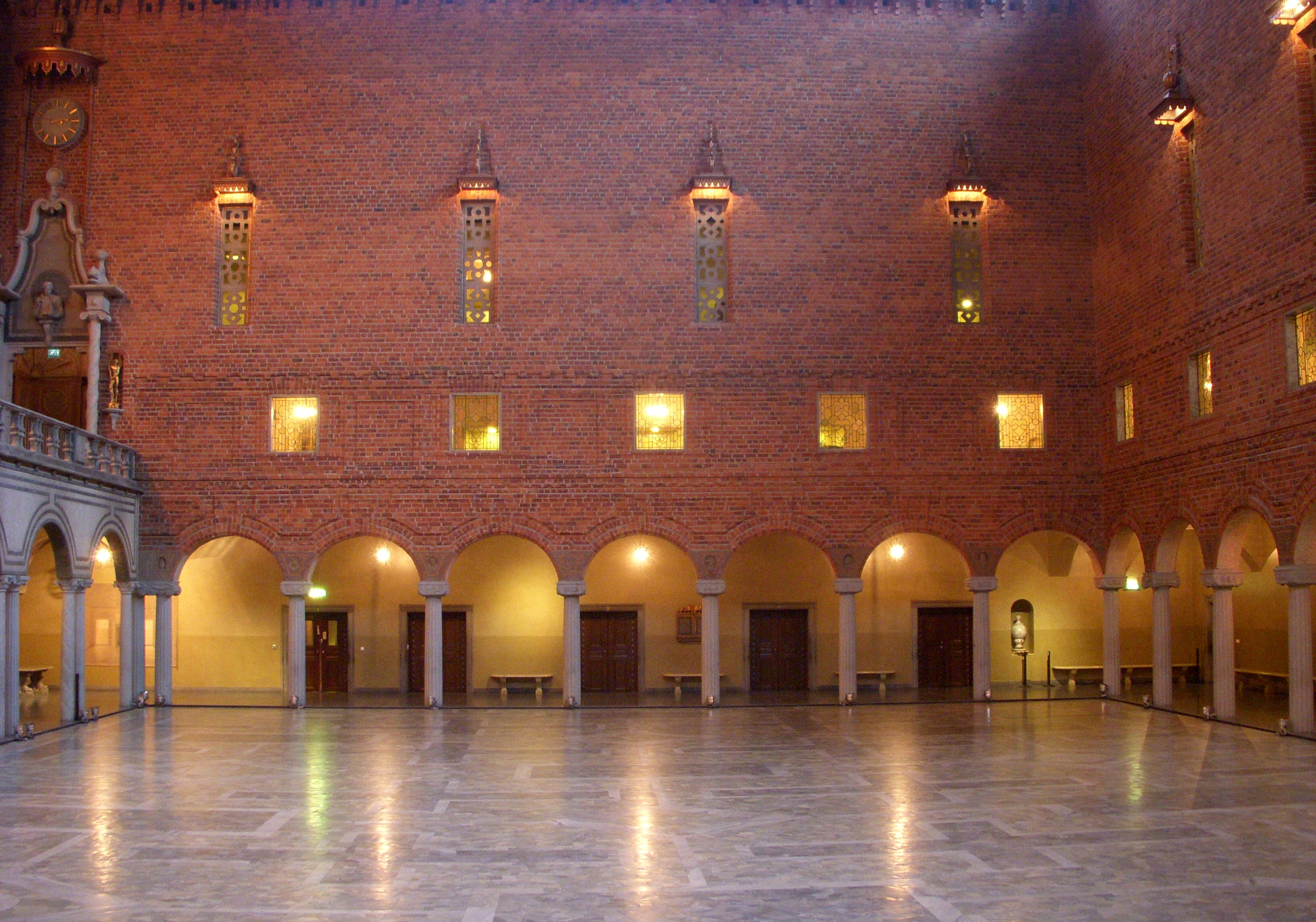
Stockholm City Hall, Blue Hall

John Edward Taylor, OMI (November 15, 1914 – September 9, 1976) was an American Roman Catholic bishop. The first American-born bishop to head a European diocese, he was Bishop of Stockholm in Sweden from 1962 to 1976.

== Early life and priesthood ==
Taylor was born in East St. Louis, Illinois, to Robert and Elizabeth (née Pohl) Taylor. After attending St. Henry’s Preparatory Seminary in Belleville, he took his vows for the Oblates of Mary Immaculate in 1934. He continued his studies in Rome, where he attended the Angelicum and the Gregorian.

On May 25, 1940, Taylor was ordained to the priesthood in Rome. He earned his Ph.D. at Ottawa University in 1941, with a thesis on the philosophy of John Dewey. Returning to the United States, he taught at the Oblates’ minor seminary in Belleville before serving as superior of Oblate seminaries in Carthage, Missouri (1947-1953) and in Pass Christian, Mississippi (1953-1958).

In 1958, Taylor was chosen to lead a mission to revive the Catholic Church in Greenland. He first established a headquarters in the Copenhagen suburb of Herlev and, in 1960, became the first Catholic priest to settle in Greenland since the Reformation.

== Bishop of Stockholm ==
On July 2, 1962, Taylor was appointed Bishop of Stockholm in Sweden by Pope John XXIII. He received his episcopal consecration on the following September 21 from Archbishop Bruno Heim, with Bishops Jacques Mangers and Fulton J. Sheen serving as co-consecrators, in the Blue Hall of Stockholm City Hall. The event was the first consecration of a Catholic bishop in Sweden since 1531. His episcopal motto was Evangelizare misit me.

During his tenure, the estimated number of Catholics in the Diocese of Stockholm (which covers all of Sweden) rose from 27,000 to 75,000, and the number of priests rose from 64 to 97. He also established a priests’ council, a Catholic education commission, and an ecumenical commission. He served as chairman of the Scandinavian Bishops Conference from 1970 to 1973.

Taylor attended all four sessions of the Second Vatican Council between 1962 and 1965. He presented Catholic peace activist Tom Cornell with the commemorative medal given to each bishop who participated in the Council, in acknowledgment of "the role that the Catholic Peace Fellowship, together with the Catholic Worker, played at the Council – the role of invisible Council Father."

== Later life ==
Following an operation to remove a cerebral tumor, Taylor resigned as Bishop of Stockholm on June 3, 1976. He retired to a nursing home run by the Bridgettines in Djursholm, where he died a few months later on September 9, at the age of 61.
