= Anders Arborelius =

Swedish Carmelite and cardinal

His Eminence Anders Arborelius OCD
- Cardinal; Bishop of Stockholm
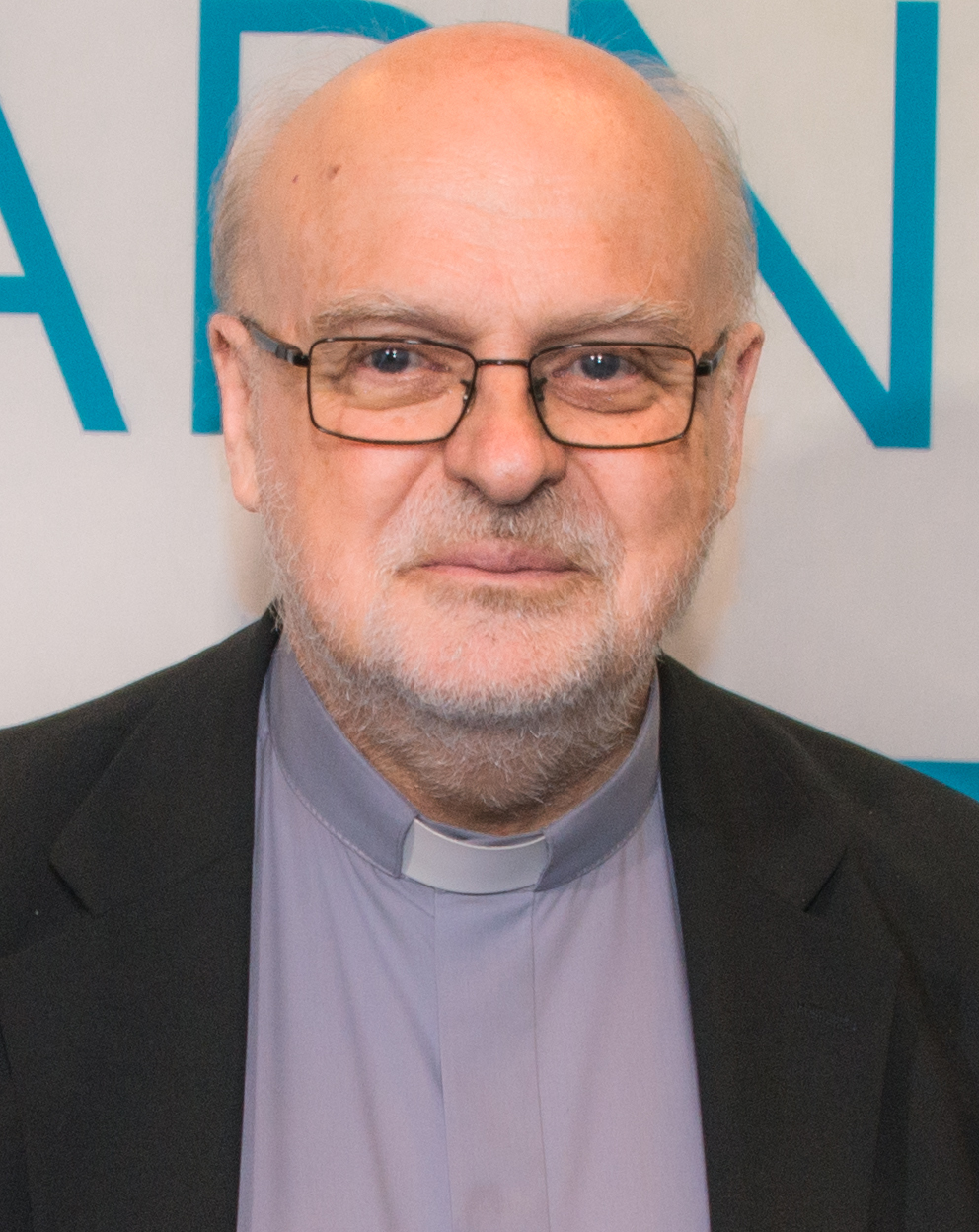
- Cardinal Arborelius in 2019
- Church: Catholic Church
- Diocese: Stockholm
- Appointed: 17 November 1998
- Predecessor: Hubertus Brandenburg
- Other post: Cardinal-Priest of Santa Maria degli Angeli (2017–present)
- Previous post: President of the Scandinavian Bishops Conference (2005-2015)

Orders
- Ordination: 8 September 1979 by Hubertus Brandenburg
- Consecration: 29 December 1998 by Hubertus Brandenburg
- Created cardinal: 28 June 2017 by Pope Francis
- Rank: Cardinal-Priest

Personal details
- Born: Lars Anders Arborelius; 24 September 1949 (age 77) Sorengo, Switzerland
- Motto: In Laudem Gloriae (To the Praise of Glory)
- Signature: Anders Arborelius's signature

Styles of Anders Arborelius
- Reference style: His Eminence
- Spoken style: Your Eminence
- Religious style: Cardinal
- Informal style: Cardinal

Lars Anders Arborelius OCD (Swedish: [ˈânːdɛʂ arbʊˈrěːlɪɵs]; born 24 September 1949) is a senior-ranking Swedish Catholic prelate who has served as Bishop of Stockholm since 1998. Pope Francis made him a cardinal, the first ever from Scandinavia, in 2017. He is a member of the Discalced Carmelites and was considered a candidate in the 2025 papal conclave.

== Early life and ordination ==
Arborelius was born on 24 September 1949 in Sorengo, Switzerland, to Swedish Protestant parents, and grew up in Lund in Scania. He was raised as a Lutheran Protestant and always showed a lot of interest in the contemplative life, saying, "I always had this longing for a life of prayer and silent adoration." After a year-and-a-half-long process, he observed, "Truth has been given to me through the Catholic faith,” and he converted to Catholicism at the age of 20.

At first, following his conversion, he desired to be a diocesan priest, but, after reading Saint Thérèse of Lisieux's autobiography (The Story of a Soul), he wanted to be a member of the Discalced Carmelites. In 1971, two years after he became Catholic, he entered the Carmelite order at the Norraby monastery located near the town of Tågarp in Southern Sweden. During his novitiate, Wilfrid Stinissen was his spiritual director. In 1977, Arborelius took his perpetual vows in Bruges, Belgium, where he then obtained his degree in philosophy and theology. He also studied modern languages at Lund University. After obtaining his doctoral degree at the Pontifical Theological Faculty Teresianum in Rome, he was ordained as a priest in Malmö on 8 September 1979.

== Bishop ==
On 17 November 1998, Pope John Paul II appointed Arborelius Bishop of Stockholm, and he was consecrated on 29 December 1998 by Bishop Hubert Brandenburg. When he succeeded Brandenburg as the Bishop of Stockholm—the only Catholic diocese in Sweden, comprising the entire country—he became the first ethnic Swedish Catholic Bishop since the Protestant Reformation. Most Catholics in Sweden since the Reformation, particularly among the clergy, have been immigrants or of immigrant descent from all over Europe (but especially Eastern Europe) and from the Middle East, as well as Arabs and Armenians of various Catholic rites. Additionally, there are converts from various backgrounds, including some Protestant ministers, who have become part of the Catholic community in his diocese.

Arborelius took part in The Indian Priest (2015), a documentary film about Indian missionary priest Raphael Curian.

== Cardinal ==
On 21 May 2017, Pope Francis announced he would make Arborelius a cardinal, the sixth Carmelite cardinal and the first Swedish national ever to hold the position, including during Sweden's 500-year Catholic history before the Swedish reformation. Arborelius became a cardinal on 28 June 2017. He said he thought Francis was recognizing Sweden's role in accepting immigrants and promoting interdenominational dialogue.

Swedish news magazine Fokus named him "Swede of the Year" for 2017. It said that he had been "part of Swedish public debate" since 1998, that he brought "a fearless attitude" to his role in "secular and otherwise Lutheran" society, and "plays an essential role in bringing native Swedes and immigrant Swedes together".

Pope Francis made him a member of the Pontifical Council for Promoting Christian Unity on 23 December 2017. The pope also named him a member of the Congregation for the Clergy on 13 July 2019, and of the Congregation for the Oriental Churches on 6 August 2019. On 6 August 2020, Francis named him a member of the Secretariat for the Economy, and on 13 July 2022, a member of the Dicastery for Bishops.

Arborelius participated as a cardinal elector in the 2025 papal conclave. In the days leading up to the conclave, Arborelius stated that he believed evangelization should be the most important focus for the next Pope and that he should remind people of Jesus through his personality. A number of media outlets listed him as papabile—a potential candidate for the papacy. Ultimately, the conclave elected Robert Francis Prevost as Pope Leo XIV.

== Views ==
Arborelius has spoken several times on the need to promote ecumenism, noting the goal of ecumenism is to get to the point where Christians "can say [they] have a friendly spiritual relationship. We can pray together, we can work together, we have respect for each other-respect for all the differences. It’s also important to realize that we cannot condemn the other because they have another point of view." He stressed that Sweden is a special case study as to how different Christian denominations can work together, as he works closely in ecumenical dialogue with Bishop Karin Johannesson of the Church of Sweden: “We’re all [seen as] a bit weird, strange people [in Swedish society], that means that we have to stand together and show to the outside society that, as believers, we are doing more than fighting between ourselves."

The cardinal surprised many by the extent to which he implemented Pope Francis' Traditionis Custodes, which restricts the vetus ordo, or the Old Latin Mass, in Sweden. Several priests who had celebrated the traditional mass (including in the Cathedral) had to travel to other churches and chapels that do not belong to the Catholic Church.

Regarding female ordination, Arborelius expressed in a 2023 interview that the issue was already settled by Pope John Paul II's 1994 Ordinatio Sacerdotalis which held that priestly ministry in the Catholic Church is reserved for men alone.

Arborelius has spoken in favor of immigration, noting that the growth of Catholicism in Sweden is largely driven by migrants. He acknowledged the difficulties that native-born Catholics have with his immigration viewpoint, saying in a 2017 interview: "I’ve also been attacked by some Catholics who think I’ve been too open to immigration because they wanted to be more solidly Swedish." In a 2025 interview, Arborelius stated that "Europe cannot survive without immigrants, there are no children anymore," and that society must recognize that "we live in a global reality and we cannot survive without migrants."

Catholic Church titles
Preceded by Hubertus Brandenburg	Bishop of Stockholm; 29 December 1998 – present	Incumbent
Preceded by William Henry Keeler	Cardinal-Priest of Santa Maria degli Angeli; 28 July 2017 – present	Incumbent
