= Nordic Bishops' Conference =

Assembly of Catholic bishops

- Nordiska biskopskonferensen (in Swedish); Nordisk bispekonference (in Danish); Den nordiske bispekonferanse (in Norwegian); Skandinavian piispakonferenssi (in Finnish); Norræna biskuparáðstefnan (in Icelandic)
- Abbreviation: CES
- Formation: 1923
- Type: Episcopal conference
- Legal status: Civil nonprofit
- Region served: Sweden, Norway, Finland, Denmark and Iceland
- Members: Active and retired Catholic bishops of the Sweden, Norway, Finland, Denmark and Iceland
- President: Erik Varden
- Main organ: Conference

The Nordic Bishops' Conference (Latin: Conferentia Episcopalis Scandiæ) is an episcopal conference of Catholic bishops covering the Nordic countries of Sweden, Norway, Finland, Denmark and Iceland.

In 2023, it has 8 members who represent all five Catholic dioceses and all two territorial prelatures in the Nordic countries. It is unusual for bishops' conferences to be organised across several countries, but this reflects the fact that there are fewer than half a million Catholics in these countries. The Conference states as its tasks:

- to further the common pastoral work in the region
- to enable the bishops to consult with one another
- to coordinate the work of the Church in the dioceses
- to make possible common decisions on the regional level
- to facilitate contacts with the Catholic Church in Europe and in the whole world

The most important decision-making organ is the plenary session. This meets twice a year at different places in the Nordic dioceses and sometimes outside of Northern Europe. Besides that there is the Permanent Council which also meets twice a year to plan the plenary sessions and to decide on urgent matters. Between meetings it is the secretary general, currently Sister Anna Mirijam Kaschner, CPS, who coordinates the work and the contacts between the bishops.

== History of the Scandinavian Bishops Conference ==
The first known episcopal encounter took place in May 1923 in Gothenburg. The Vicars Apostolic of Sweden (Mgr. Johannes E. Müller: 1877–1965), Denmark (Mgr. Josef Brems: 1870–1958), and Norway (Mgr. Jan O. Smit: 1883–1972) discussed themes of common interest such as the best way of dealing with the congregations of women religious, how to foster the spiritual life of their priests, but above all how to prepare for the announced Scandinavian tour of the Cardinal Prefect of the Roman Congregation Propaganda Fide, Willem Marinus van Rossum, the first such dignitary to enter Scandinavia since the Reformation.

The next encounter took place in two stages: first in Stockholm on August 12, 1923, when Bishop Müller played host to Bishops Brems and Smit en route to Helsinki. During a festive reunion Bishop Müller launched a warm appeal for increased Nordic Catholic collaboration and announced that an important Scandinavian Catholic congress probably would soon be arranged in Copenhagen. Nine years, however, were to pass before this became a reality.

The second stage was celebrated in Helsinki on August 15, 1923, when Bishop M. J. Buckx, S.C.I. (1881–1946) received the episcopal consecration at the hands of Cardinal van Rossum. The only recorded subject for discussion during the following day's meeting was the Cardinal Prefect's earnest call for the founding of a minor seminary in Scandinavia, a matter which the bishops decided to take very seriously in spite of the obvious difficulties involved.

The third meeting took place in Copenhagen in February 1924 where, in addition to the above-mentioned prelates, the Local Ordinary of the newly erected Prefecture Apostolic of Iceland, Rev. Marteinn Meulenberg, S.M., completed the Nordic representation. The discussions, referred to as being "private and of an informative character," seem to have been a continuation of the agenda from the previous encounters.

A further meeting was held in Stockholm in 1927 without, unfortunately, leaving anything for the record.

In August 1932 the announced Internordic Catholic rally finally took place in Copenhagen in the form of a Eucharistic Congress. All five countries were represented. Bishop Smit, who had resigned in 1927, was replaced by Bishop-elect Mgr. Jacques Mangers, S.M. (1889–1972), Vicar of South Norway, that country having in 1931 been divided into three jurisdictions. Among the many foreign dignitaries present for the occasion we find, once more, Cardinal van Rossum (who died only some weeks later) and Cardinal August Hlond of Gniezno and Poznań. It stands to reason that the busy programme of a Eucharistic Congress did not allow time for a formal Conference meeting.

More is known of the next encounter in Stockholm in April 1936, when Bishop Müller chaired a two-day meeting including bishops Brems, Mangers, and William Cobben, S.C.I., Finland's new Vicar Apostolic (1897–1985). Iceland was unrepresented.

The matters discussed were to re-emerge during later Conference Plenaries: the fostering of vocations both to the priesthood and the religious life, as well as the spiritual and material well-being of candidates; the image of the Catholic Church in the mass media of the day; basic principles for pastoral care; the production of fitting literature for Catholics, etc. In the compte-rendu consequently sent to the Propaganda Fide Congregation in Rome, three salient points were made:

1. the necessity of adapting Catholic institutions to the high level of culture in the North;
2. the urgent necessity of establishing a minor seminary;
3. the fact that nothing damages Catholicism more than immoral behaviour and scandal within the Church itself.

Very soon after, the same ordinaries assembled again, this time in Copenhagen (July 1936) at the direct behest of the Propaganda Fide Congregation, in order to continue their deliberations. Alas, nothing came of the ambitious plan to establish a minor seminary. The project, however, has continued to haunt the Nordic bishops' meetings over the years.

A further conference was not convened until after the Second World War, when Bishop Müller in June 1946 chaired a meeting in Stockholm. Participants were the aforementioned bishops, except for Denmark where Bishop Theodor Suhr, O.S.B. (b. 1896) had replaced Bishop Brems. In addition, the Apostolic Prefects of Middle Norway, Antonius Deutsch, SS.CC. (1896–1980) and North Norway, Johannes Wember, M.S.F. (1900–1980) were also present. Only Iceland was missing. Several points of interest were brought up: especially marriage questions seemed to have been a matter in need of clarification.

A final meeting took place in Oslo in September 1951, where marriage questions were again on the agenda. Various items were discussed, amongst others the growing conviction that the time had now come for the Apostolic Vicariates to become fully fledged dioceses. It was decided that a request to this effect be forwarded to Rome. As we now know, this was soon to be granted.

The prehistory of this informal conference activity came to a close when in 1959 Pope John XXIII decided to send a permanent Apostolic Visitor to the five Nordic Countries (Archbishop M.H. Lucas), an arrangement which was soon to end in the formal establishment of the Apostolic Delegation to Scandinavia on March 1, 1960, with Mgr. Lucas in charge.

The establishment of the Scandinavian Episcopal Conference followed only two months after that of the Apostolic Delegation. Convoked by the Apostolic Delegate, the entire hierarchy of the five countries met in Bergen (South Norway) on May 1, 1960, with the prime purpose of founding a proper bishops' conference. Some participants were still the same as in 1951 (Bishops Cobben, Mangers, Suhr, and Wember). Newcomers were Bishops Ansgar Nelson, O.S.B., of Stockholm (b. 1906), Johannes Gunnarson, S.M.M., of Iceland (1897–1972), and Johannes Rüth, SS.CC., of Central Norway (1899–1978).

After some days of preliminary clarifications, the "Conventus Ordinariorum Scandiae" was formally established on May 4. After a secret vote, Bishops Suhr and Nelson were elected chairman and vice-chairman respectively.

The meeting, which lasted a full week, bore most of the marks of proper Episcopal Conferences developed as a result of the Second Vatican Council. Agreement was reached on several issues, such as common days of fasting and abstinence, clerical clothing, Internordic jurisdiction for hearing confessions, a common Catholic Directory, the canonical form for marriage, altar boys' societies, a yearly vocations Sunday, and other items of mutual interest and uncertainty.

The erection of episcopal conferences was as yet by no means obligatory. This, then, was a freely agreed-upon instrument of mutual help and cooperation. And as such it was in advance of most European Conferences, which were only established in connection with the Second Vatican Council (1962–1965). Rome, though praising the Scandinavian initiative by sending a high-level congratulatory telegram, did not formally recognise this or any of the existing conferences. Nor did the Holy See as yet use them as consultative bodies, but all this was to come. The necessities arising from Vatican II brought about the change.

The Second Vatican Council assembled approximately 2500 major prelates from all five continents. It soon became clear that a dividing up of this large body was necessary. But how to go about carrying out this division? The answer was by resorting to the already partly existing structures, i.e., the Bishops' Conferences. These would normally coincide with national boundaries, as had long been the case with the German Episcopal Conferences which had existed for over 100 years. A hurried establishment of such entities, willed by the Holy See to be ad hoc, was effected for the sole purpose of facilitating the working out of common stands on the Council documents. Any bishop who presented a paper in the Council aula in the name of such a conference was granted priority.

The Council itself decided that episcopal conferences were practical and useful bodies which should carry on in an institutionalised way. It was also clear that the Holy See, which traditionally had had to deal with individual dioceses, liked the idea of sharing some of the burden of labour and responsibility with these much larger units. After long discussions and several attempts at formulating practical guidelines, the Council could finally lay down a framework for such conferences in its Decree Christus Dominus (about the Pastoral Responsibility of Bishops), promulgated on October 28, 1965. This framework was followed by a more detailed set of rulings in the Papal motu proprio Ecclesiae Sanctae of August 6, 1966. Although there was now a set of guidelines common to all bishops' conferences, each is obliged to work out its own statutes, which, however, need the subsequent approval of the Holy See.

The Nordic Episcopal Conference had its statutes already worked out and approved by its members in 1962. When the Vatican Council institutionalised and imposed conferences generally, new statutes had to be elaborated – a task which, starting with the first revision over four conference sessions in 1965, has continued at regular intervals. This is because Rome prefers to approve such rulings for a maximum period of five years, ad experimentum as the formula goes. When the new body of Canon Law became effective on the first Sunday of Advent 1983, most of these statutes had to undergo at least revisory touches. And so the newly updated statutes of the Nordic Episcopal Conference, approved by the bishops in its Plenary Session in Stella Maris near Helsinki on September 27, 1984, were duly transmitted to Rome and received unqualified approbation on January 19, 1985.

== Past presidents ==
- John Edward Taylor: 1970–1973
- Paul Verschuren: 1973–1978
- John Willem Gran: 1978–1986
- Paul Verschuren: 1986–1998
- Gerhard Schwenzer: 1999–2005
- Anders Arborelius: 2005–2015
- Czeslaw Kozon: 2015–2024

== See also ==
- List of Catholic dioceses in Nordic Europe
