= Hubertus Brandenburg =

Catholic bishop of Stockholm (1923–2009)

His Excellency Hubert Brandenburg
- Bishop of Stockholm
- Church: Roman Catholic
- Diocese: Stockholm
- Appointed: 21 November 1977
- In office: 1977–1998
- Previous post: Auxiliary Bishop of Osnabrück (1974-1977)

Orders
- Ordination: 20 December 1952
- Consecration: 26 January 1975 by Helmut Hermann Wittler
- Rank: Bishop

Personal details
- Born: 17 November 1923 Osnabrück, Germany
- Died: 4 November 2009 (aged 85) Osnabrück, Germany
- Coat of arms

Ordination history
History
Priestly ordination
- Date: 20 December 1952
- Place: Osnabrück, Germany
Episcopal consecration
- Principal consecrator: Helmut Hermann Wittler
- Co-consecrators: Andrzej Maria Deskur, John Albert von Rudloff
- Date: 26 January 1975
Episcopal succession
Bishops consecrated by Hubertus Brandenburg as principal consecrator
- Leonard W. Kenney: 24 August 1987
- Anders Arborelius: 29 December 1998

Hubertus Brandenburg (17 November 1923 – 4 November 2009) was a Catholic bishop of Stockholm. He was ordained priest in Osnabrück on 20 December 1952. On 12 December 1974, he was appointed by Pope Paul VI as auxiliary bishop of Osnabrück. On 21 November 1977, he was appointed as Bishop of Stockholm. He resigned in 1998, and was succeeded by Bishop Anders Arborelius.

== Biography ==
Brandenburg was born in Osnabrück, Germany, in 1923. After graduation at the Carolinum High School in Osnabrück, he was drafted into military service. As a Marine soldier, he rose to speed boat commander. Brandenburg studied law and economics after the war. He then moved to the Catholic Theology Faculty of the University of Münster. Ordained a priest in 1952, he was a chaplain in Hamburg Winterhude 1955 to 1958, and completed a PhD in Rome. In 1967 he was appointed a canon, then appointed to the finance director in Osnabruck.

In 1974, Brandenburg was appointed Titular Bishop of Strathernia and auxiliary bishop of Osnabrück by Pope Paul VI. He was consecrated by Bishop Helmut Hermann Wittler on 26 January 1975, co-consecrators were the Curia Bishop and President of the Pontifical Council for Social Communications, Andrzej Maria Deskur, and Auxiliary Bishop of Osnabrück John Albert von Rudloff.

On 13 May 1972 Brandenburg was invested in the Order of the Holy Sepulchre. In 1976, he became a member of the Sovereign Military Order of Malta.

In 1977 he was appointed bishop of the Diocese of Stockholm. He was a longtime vice chairman of the Nordic Bishops Conference. After his retirement, Brandenburg lived first in Helsingborg, before returning to his home town of Osnabrück.

Since 1946, Brandenburg was a member of the Catholic fraternity KDSt.V. Sauerlandia Munster, a Catholic student fraternity that belongs to the Cartellverband der katholischen deutschen Studentenverbindungen. He was a grandson of member of the German Reichstag Carl Brandenburg, who succeeded Ludwig Windthorst from 1891 to 1902 representing the constituency of Meppen in the Reichstag.

Brandenburg died aged 85 in Osnabrück.

Catholic Church titles
| Preceded by John E. Taylor | Bishop of Stockholm; 1977 – 1998 | Succeeded by Anders Arborelius |
