= Chris Skinner =

Chris Skinner may refer to:

- Chris Skinner (singer) (born 1958), New Zealand singer
- Chris Skinner (statistician) (1953–2020), British statistician
- Chris Skinner (Canadian football) (born 1961), Canadian football running back
- Chris Skinner (EastEnders), fictional character introduced in 2014
- Christopher Skinner, mathematician
