= List of Catholic musicians =

List of Catholic Church musicians is a list of people who perform or compose Catholic music, a branch of Christian music. Names should be limited to those whose Catholicism affected their music and should preferably only include those musicians whose works have been performed liturgically in a Catholic service, or who perform specifically in a Catholic religious context.

== Traditional and hymnal ==
- Paolo Agostino, all his surviving works are religious.
- Vittoria Aleotti, Augustinian nun and composer.
- Gregorio Allegri, Italian composer of the Roman School and priest notable for Miserere mei, Deus.
- Giovenale Ancina, Beatified writer of spiritual songs.
- Felice Anerio, Italian composer of the Roman School and priest.
- Caterina Assandra, Benedictine nun and composer.
- Thoinot Arbeau, Catholic priest who composed the originally secular Ding Dong Merrily on High.
- Jean de Brébeuf, Canonized Jesuit who composed the Huron Carol.
- William Byrd, English Catholic (in the era of Elizabeth I and the Stuarts), composer of 3 polyphonic masses and other sacred music.
- Hermannus Contractus, Alma Redemptoris Mater said to have been written by him.
- Tommaso da Celano, Dies Irae
- Orlando de Lassus, late Renaissance composer polyphonic masses and sacred music.
- Guillaume de Machaut, medieval French composer.
- Cristobal de Morales, Renaissance Spanish composer of sacred music.
- Josquin des Prez, composer of Renaissance polyphonic masses and sacred music.
- Guillaume Dufay, worked for the Papal chapel, composer of Renaissance polyphonic masses and sacred music.
- John Dunstaple or Dunstable, early Renaissance English composer of polyphonic sacred music.
- Frederick William Faber, Catholic convert who wrote Catholic hymns like Faith of Our Fathers.
- Giovanni Gabrieli, late Renaissance/early Baroque Italian composer who composed much sacred music.
- Jacobus Gallus, Slovenian composer of sacred music and member of the Cistercians.
- Joseph Gelineau, French composer of Gelineau psalmody and music for the Taizé Community.
- Carlo Gesualdo, late Renaissance Italian composer, most famous for madrigals, but also composed some sacred music.
- Francisco Guerrero, late Renaissance Spanish composer of both sacred and secular music.
- Hildegard of Bingen, Benedictine abbess and one of the earliest known female composers.
- Hucbald, ninth century Benedictine composer and music theorist.
- Luca Marenzio, Madrigale spirituale
- Domenico Mustafà, Castrato composer for the Sistine Chapel choir.
- Giovanni Maria Nanino, Italian composer of the Roman School.
- Johannes Ockeghem, composer of Renaissance polyphonic masses.
- Frederick Oakeley, convert who translated Adeste Fideles
- Paul the Deacon, Benedictine who wrote Ut queant laxis.
- Giovanni Pierluigi da Palestrina, late Renaissance Italian composer of polyphonic sacred music, considered by many the greatest such composer, "a tremendous influence on the development of Catholic Church music."
- Thomas Tallis, devoutly Catholic composer of polyphonic church music in Tudor England. "The earliest works by Tallis that survive are devotional antiphons to the Virgin Mary."
- Jean Tisserand, Franciscan friar and composer believed to have composed the hymn O filii et filiae.
- Tomás Luis de Victoria, late Renaissance Spanish composer of polyphonic sacred music, a priest at the Convent of Las Descalzas Reales.
- Samuel Webbe, English composer of Catholic hymns.

== Composers who wrote Catholic sacred music ==
Note: The term classical music has been used broadly to describe many eras which do not fit the label. Initially the term specifically meant 1730–1820 (the Classical period), but for this list the period from the Baroque period to the modern era will be included in this section. This is because Renaissance and especially Medieval music tends to be dominated, in the West, by Catholic religious music.

- Mateo Albéniz, Spanish composer and priest.
- Johann Christian Bach, son of J. S. Bach, converted to Catholicism and wrote much Catholic liturgical and sacred music.
- Ludwig van Beethoven, his sacred music includes the famous Missa solemnis and Mass in C major.
- Hector Berlioz, though an agnostic, Berlioz wrote a famous Requiem as well as another mass and a Te Deum.
- Heinrich Ignaz Franz Biber, known in part for the Rosary Sonatas also called the Mystery Sonatas.
- František Brixi, eighteenth-century Czech composer. He wrote some 290 church compositions and was Kapellmeister of St. Vitus Cathedral.
- Severo Bonini, Benedictine and Baroque composer of sacred music.
- Anton Bruckner, Austrian late Romantic composer most famous for his symphonies. Devoutly Catholic, he wrote at least seven Masses and much other Catholic sacred music.
- Francesca Caccini, Italian early Baroque female composer. Composed some motets.
- Francesco Cavalli, Italian early Baroque composer of operas and some sacred music, including a requiem mass.
- Marc-Antoine Charpentier, French Baroque composer. Composed several masses and other sacred music.
- Luigi Cherubini, late eighteenth- and early nineteenth-century Italian composer of operas and sacred music. He composed 11 masses
- Salvatore Di Vittorio, Italian neoclassical composer and conductor
- Gaetano Donizetti, most famous as composer of operas, he also composed some sacred music including two Masses.
- Antonín Dvořák, Czech composer, most famous for the New World Symphony. A devout Catholic, his sacred compositions include a Requiem, the Mass in D major, Stabat Mater and Te Deum.
- Edward Elgar, devoutly Catholic English composer of nineteenth and early twentieth century. His most famous religious work is The Dream of Gerontius whose text is a poem by Cardinal Newman
- Gabriel Fauré, nineteenth century French composer. Although his religious views are obscure, he was a renowned church organist, and composed a significant amount of Catholic sacred music, including of a famous Requiem Mass.
- César Franck, nineteenth-century French composer, most famous for his Symphony in D. Composer of Panis Angelicus.
- Paolo Giorza
- Christoph Willibald Gluck, knighted by Pope Benedict XIV, was important in the history of opera, but wrote only a few pieces of sacred music.
- Charles Gounod, French composer whose religious music includes a very famous setting of the Ave Maria and Inno e Marcia Pontificale.
- Henryk Górecki, late twentieth century Polish composer, most famous for his Third Symphony. Also has composed Catholic sacred music.
- Pietro Guglielmi, In 1793 he became maestro di cappella at St Peter's, Rome.
- Johann Michael Haydn, younger brother of Joseph Haydn, and prolific composer of sacred music, including 47 masses.
- Joseph Haydn, great Austrian composer of the Classical period. Credited with inventing the symphony. Also composed 14 Masses (including the Mass in Time of War), 2 Te Deums and a Stabat Mater. Very devout, often prayed the rosary when he had trouble composing. Teacher of both Mozart and Beethoven.
- Zoltán Kodály, twentieth century Hungarian composer. Composed a Missa Brevis, a Te Deum, and Psalmus Hungaricus.
- Joseph Kromolicki, German composer of the late Romantic tradition
- Guglielmo Enrico Lardelli An Italian-Australian who composed secular and liturgical works.
- Alphonsus Liguori, Italian bishop, saint, theologian, artist, poet, lawyer, and composer of mostly hymns.
- Franz Liszt, famed pianist and Romantic composer, mostly of piano works. He became a Franciscan tertiary. Composed much sacred music, including 5 masses.
- Antonio Lotti, made his career at St Mark's Basilica and composed numerous Masses.
- Wolfram Menschick (1937–2010) who composed more than 30 masses and other liturgical music.
- Olivier Messiaen, twentieth century French composer. "Many of his compositions depict what he termed 'the marvellous aspects of the faith', drawing on his unshakeable Roman Catholicism."
- Claudio Monteverdi, Italian composer, famous from madrigals, and important in the transition from Renaissance to Baroque styles. Most well-known sacred piece is Vespro della Beata Vergine 1610 (Vespers for the Blessed Virgin) and was ordained in 1633
- Stephen Moreno, Benedictine missionary to New Norcia in Australia who composed Masses published in Europe.
- Wolfgang Amadeus Mozart, composed 18 Masses including the Requiem Mass, the Coronation Mass, and the Great Mass in C minor, and much other sacred music, including Vespers, Ave Verum Corpus, and Exultate Jubilate.
- Arvo Pärt, late twentieth-century Estonian composer. Though Eastern Orthodox, his sacred music is primarily in Latin Catholic forms, including a Mass, Te Deum, and Stabat Mater.
- Jan Dismas Zelenka, Czech Baroque composer who is most appreciated for his complex Mass settings and harmonic and contrapuntal inventiveness.
- Giovanni Battista Pergolesi, Italian Baroque composer who wrote one of the most famous settings of the Stabat Mater.
- Don Lorenzo Perosi, Catholic priest and Director of the Sistine Choir under five Popes.
- Francis Poulenc, twentieth century French composer. His most famous sacred works are the Mass in G, a Gloria, a Stabat Mater, and Dialogues of the Carmelites.
- Licinio Refice, composed over 300 pieces of sacred music
- Georg Reutter, church composer.
- Josef Rheinberger, twelve Masses and a Stabat Mater.
- Gioachino Rossini, one of the greatest composers of Italian Opera. Late in life wrote a famous Stabat Mater and the Petite messe solennelle
- Antonio Salieri, Italian composer of Classical period. Taught Beethoven, Schubert, and Liszt. Composed operas and sacred music, including ten hymns and nine psalms.
- José Joaquim dos Santos, Portuguese Baroque composer almost exclusively of sacred music performed in Portugal and Brazil.
- Alessandro Scarlatti, Italian Baroque composer, whose most notable sacred composition is the St. Cecelia mass.
- Domenico Scarlatti, Italian Baroque composer, his sacred music includes a well known Stabat Mater and Salve Regina.
- Franz Schubert, great classical/early Romantic Austrian composer. Most famous for Lieder and symphonies. Also composed 6 masses and much other sacred music, including a famous Ave Maria (whose original text was a prayer to Mary, but not the famous Hail Mary prayer). List of compositions by Franz Schubert
- Robert Schumann, German Romantic composer. Though Protestant, he composed a Mass in C minor and a Requiem Mass.
- Antonio Soler, Spanish priest and composer.
- Cassius Clement Stearns, American organist and composer, whose work included several settings of the Mass and of Vespers.
- Igor Stravinsky, though an Eastern Orthodox Christian, Stravinsky composed a notable Catholic Mass.
- Ralph Vaughan Williams, twentieth century English composer, an agnostic Anglican, who composed or arranged much Anglican Church music. He composed a few works in Catholic liturgical forms, including a Mass and a Te Deum.
- Giuseppe Verdi, though not religious, he wrote a few religious works, including his great Messa da Requiem.
- Antonio Vivaldi, called "The Red Priest" because of his hair. His religious music includes several large choral works (such as the Gloria), small solo motets, and hymnals con instrumenti.
- John Francis Wade, English layman hymnist.
- Carl Maria von Weber, German composer of Classical period, who wrote some sacred music that was popular especially in the nineteenth century.
- Niccolò Antonio Zingarelli, appointed choir master of the Sistine Chapel in 1804.

=== Roman School ===
The Roman School is a group of composers strongly linked to the Vatican and the Council of Trent. Many of them were, or became, priests. Although much of their work is too early to be mentioned here it did survive into the early Baroque. Giovanni Pierluigi da Palestrina is generally seen as the most famous member. As a list of members is in the article on the subject, repetition of names in it should be normally avoided, although Palestrina is notable enough to be in both.

=== 21st Century Classical School ===
There is a small but growing school of church composers, favoring a return to Catholic music that can be called "classical", writing original organ, choral, and vocal music that is often based on Gregorian chant.

== Twentieth century and contemporary music ==
=== Popular composers and artists ===
Contemporary Catholic music takes many forms, from modern hymnody to inculturated sacred works. The genre of modern Catholic music is continuing to grow.

Modern Catholic musicians tend toward two main forms of expression: liturgical and non-liturgical. In a liturgical context, music is performed in a manner intended to heighten the spiritual atmosphere of a liturgical service, such as during Sunday Mass, Eucharistic adoration or Stations of the Cross, and is mandated to follow the musical tradition and decrees of the Church, such as those found in Musicae Sacrae and Tra le Sollecitudini for the Latin rite. The non-liturgical context, though very much worshipful, usually takes the form of a concert or gathering without the presence of a liturgical service and outside of the Mass. Non-liturgical settings are mainly focused on building Christian fellowship within Catholic communities. Non-liturgical artists find the opportunity to uniquely share their faith through their personal lyrics, and directly to audiences between songs, and these gatherings, since they are not a rite of the Church, but a form of personal and popular devotion, are free from the liturgical requirements that accompany a solemn act of worship in a liturgy. Although Catholic musicians tend toward one expression over the other, many will minister within both expressions with the appropriate music styles for each.

The following popular composers and performers are of note:

==== Liturgical artists ====
- Domenico Bartolucci - Catholic Cardinal who composed "Misa Jubilei," while he was still a priest and has other religious compositions.
- Jacques Berthier - French liturgical composer and organist notable for providing music for the ecumenical Taizé Community.
- Dave Brubeck - legendary jazz pianist who attained acclaim with recordings such as "Take Five" and "Blue Rondo a la Turk." He wrote a Catholic Mass "To Hope! A Celebration" and several other religious works.
- Herbert Cosgrove
- Maurice Duruflé, French composer
- Marco Frisina - Italian priest and composer who founded the Choir of the Diocese of Rome in 1984.
- László Halmos - Hungarian composer
- Eduardo Hontiveros - Jesuit noted for Filipino liturgical movement, received the Pro Ecclesia et Pontifice.
- Giuseppe Liberto - Italian priest and composer who was the former director of the Sistine Chapel Choir.
- John McCormack- sang for an International Eucharistic Congress and declared a Count by Pope Pius XI.
- James MacMillan - contemporary Scottish composer
- Colin Mawby - English organist, conductor, and composer knighted into the Order of St. Gregory the Great by Pope Benedict XVI.
- Nicola Montani - compiled The St. Gregory Hymnal
- Francisco Palazón - Spanish composer
- Seán Ó Riada - composed several Irish language Masses
- Christopher Willcock - Australian priest and recipient of the Percy Jones Memorial Award for outstanding contribution to liturgical music.

==== Black Catholics ====
- Fr Clarence Rivers - pioneering Catholic Gospel artist, and one of the first to set the Mass to gospel music.
- Servant of God Thea Bowman - speaker, writer, and recording artist who spearheaded Black Catholic inculturation in the Deep South and elsewhere. Helped develop the first and only Black Catholic hymnal, "Lead Me, Guide Me".
- Archbishop James P. Lyke - liturgist who also worked on the LMGM hymnal.
- Bishop Fernand J. Cheri III, OFM - auxiliary bishop of New Orleans and noted choir director and liturgist.

==== Non-liturgical artists ====
Note: The Unity Awards began in 2001 with the intent of being a Catholic-specific equivalent to the GMA Dove Awards. In certain cases the following mentions winners of this award.

- Audrey Assad - contemporary Christian Artist known for her EP "For Love of You"
- Padre José Luís Borga - Portuguese priest and Christian music person.
- Ceili Rain - Celtic/Pop-Rock with Catholic themes, honored by the Unity Awards
- Herbert Cosgrove (died 1953) - Australian Songwriter
- Critical Mass - critically acclaimed Canadian rock band, winners of numerous awards, including two Canadian Gospel Music Association Awards for Best Rock Album. Performed for Pope John Paul II in Toronto in 2002.
- Aimé Duval - Jesuit singer-songwriter honored by Karl Rahner.
- Fr. Stan Fortuna - Catholic jazz and hip hop
- Fr Rob Galea - Roman Catholic priest and a Christian singer and songwriter from the island of Malta.
- John-Paul Kaplan - instrumental works
- Guglielmo Enrico Lardelli - Australian composer
- Michael Lewis - producer, musician, singer/songwriter. Produced and/or engineered projects for Catholic Artists including Tony Melendez, Lynn Cooper, Annie Karto, Fr. David Kelash and others. Recorded and released original contemporary Catholic music projects, toured and performed in Catholic Churches nationwide. Appeared at World Youth Day '93, The International Marian Conference and Divine Mercy Conferences in San Francisco 1993, Western Washington Charismatic Conference 1996.
- Matt Maher - singer/songwriter
- James MacMillan - contemporary Scottish composer
- Tony Meléndez - armless Christian guitarist who was Male Vocalist of the Year at the 2004 Unity Awards and performed for Pope John Paul II.
- Jelly Roll Morton - pioneer in jazz music.
- Rich Mullins - singer/songwriter
- Aaron Neville - Praise & Worship Album of the Year by the Catholic Unity Awards 2006.
- Raimund Pechotsch - Australian composer
- Seán Ó Riada - composed several Irish language Masses
- Rexband - Catholic band from India
- Dana Scallon - Catholic Northern Irish singer currently based in USA; "Songwriter of the Year" and "Female Vocalist of the Year" at the Unity Awards in 2004.
- Sister Cristina Scuccia - Italian Ursuline nun who won the 2014 season of The Voice of Italy
- Chris Skinner - Marist priest from New Zealand in Christian contemporary music.
- Son by Four - Salsa band turned Catholic band featured on EWTN.
- Natasha St-Pier - Canadian pop singer, who since 2013 has produced a number of albums with devotional lyrics inspired by the lives of Thérèse of Lisieux and Joan of Arc.
- Mary Lou Williams - legendary jazz pianist who attained acclaim with the Zodiac Suite. She performed Catholic jazz in the 1960s and 1970s including "Black Christ of the Andes" and "Mary Lou's Mass".
- Vanessa Williams
- Notker Wolf - Abbot Primate of the Benedictine Confederation played for a Christian rock group.

=== Catholic rock artists ===
- Pope Francis - Released the progressive rock album Wake Up! Music Album with His Words and Prayers
- Critical Mass

=== Liturgical music ===
Many composers have contributed to the distinct pop-inspired sound of contemporary Catholic liturgical music, including Marty Haugen, (a non-Catholic,) Dan Schutte, David Haas, Fr. Michael Joncas, and the St. Louis Jesuits. For more details, see Contemporary Catholic liturgical music. A majority of American Catholic Parishes now use at least some of this style of music in their liturgies. A recent trend has returned to the official music of the Roman Catholic Church, Gregorian chant and to newly composed music based on or inspired by it, and to liturgical projects like the Chabanel Psalms or Adam bartlett's Simple English Propers.

== See also ==
- List of Roman Catholic Church artists
- List of Anglican church composers
