= Lists of Catholics =

The Catholic Church, also known as the Roman Catholic Church, is the largest Christian church, with approximately 1.3 billion baptised Catholics worldwide, as of 2017.

== Lists ==
=== General ===
- List of former Catholics
- List of converts to the Catholic Church
- List of people excommunicated by the Catholic Church

=== Saints, and martyrs ===
- List of Catholic saints
  - Military saint
- List of saints from Africa
- List of Persian Catholic saints
- List of Catholic martyrs of the English Reformation

=== Clergy ===
- List of popes
- List of Catholic priests
- List of Catholic clergy scientists
- List of Catholic missionaries
- List of fictional clergy and religious figures#Catholic Church
- List of Pakistani Catholic priests

==== Episcopacy ====
- List of Catholic bishops in the United States
- List of Catholic bishops of India
- List of Catholic bishops of Lviv
- List of Catholic bishops in the Philippines
- List of Slovenian Catholic Bishops
- List of bishops and prince-bishops of Liège

=== By nationality ===
- List of Chinese Catholics
- List of Catholics from Nordic countries – for Catholics in a region with a low percentage of them

=== By occupation ===
- List of Catholic scientists
- List of Catholic artists – for Catholic painters and artists
- List of Catholic musicians – for hymn writers and religious music
- List of Catholic philosophers and theologians
- List of Catholic authors – for Catholic authors, editors, and TV, film, and screenwriters

=== By organisational membership ===
- List of Knights of Columbus members
- List of members of Opus Dei

== See also ==
- Catholic Directory
