= Christianity in Europe =

Christianity in Europe by percentage of country population Christianity in Europe (2010) 95–100%: Malta; Moldova; Armenia; Romania; Vatican City; 90–95%: San Marino; Portugal; Liechtenstein; Ireland; Serbia; Croatia; Poland; Iceland; 80–90%: Finland; Austria; Hungary; Bulgaria; Italy; Denmark; Ukraine; Norway; Slovakia; Monaco; Greece; Georgia; Andorra; Lithuania; 70–80%: Luxembourg; Belarus; Switzerland; Cyprus; Russia; Montenegro; Slovenia; Spain; 60–70%: France; Belgium; United Kingdom; Sweden; Germany; 50–60%: Netherlands; Latvia; North Macedonia; 30–40%: Bosnia and Herzegovina; Estonia; 20–30%: Czech Republic; 10–20%: Albania; Kazakhstan; 5–10%: Kosovo; 2–4%: Azerbaijan; < 1%: Turkey

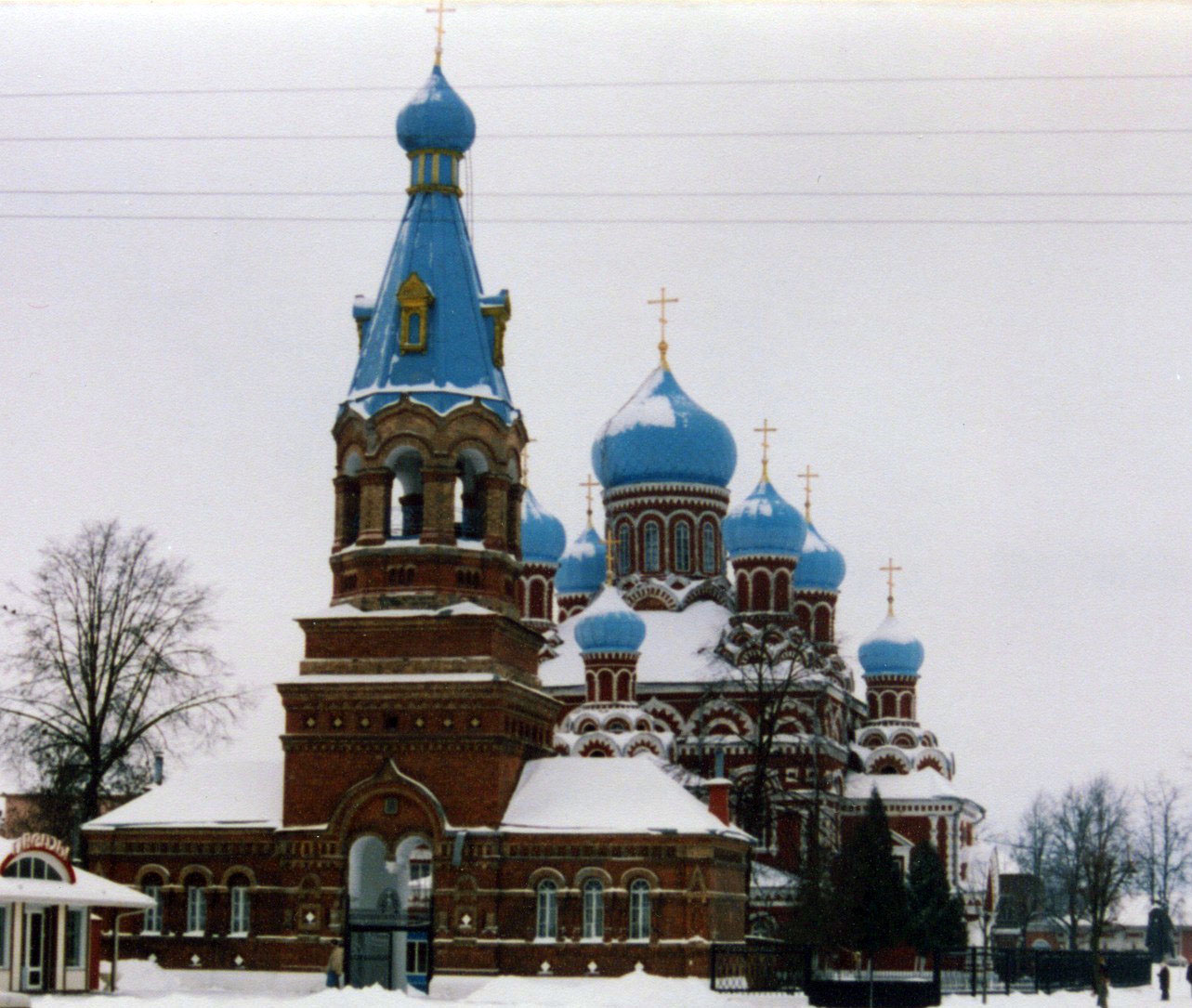
Holy Resurrection Cathedral in Borisov, Belarus

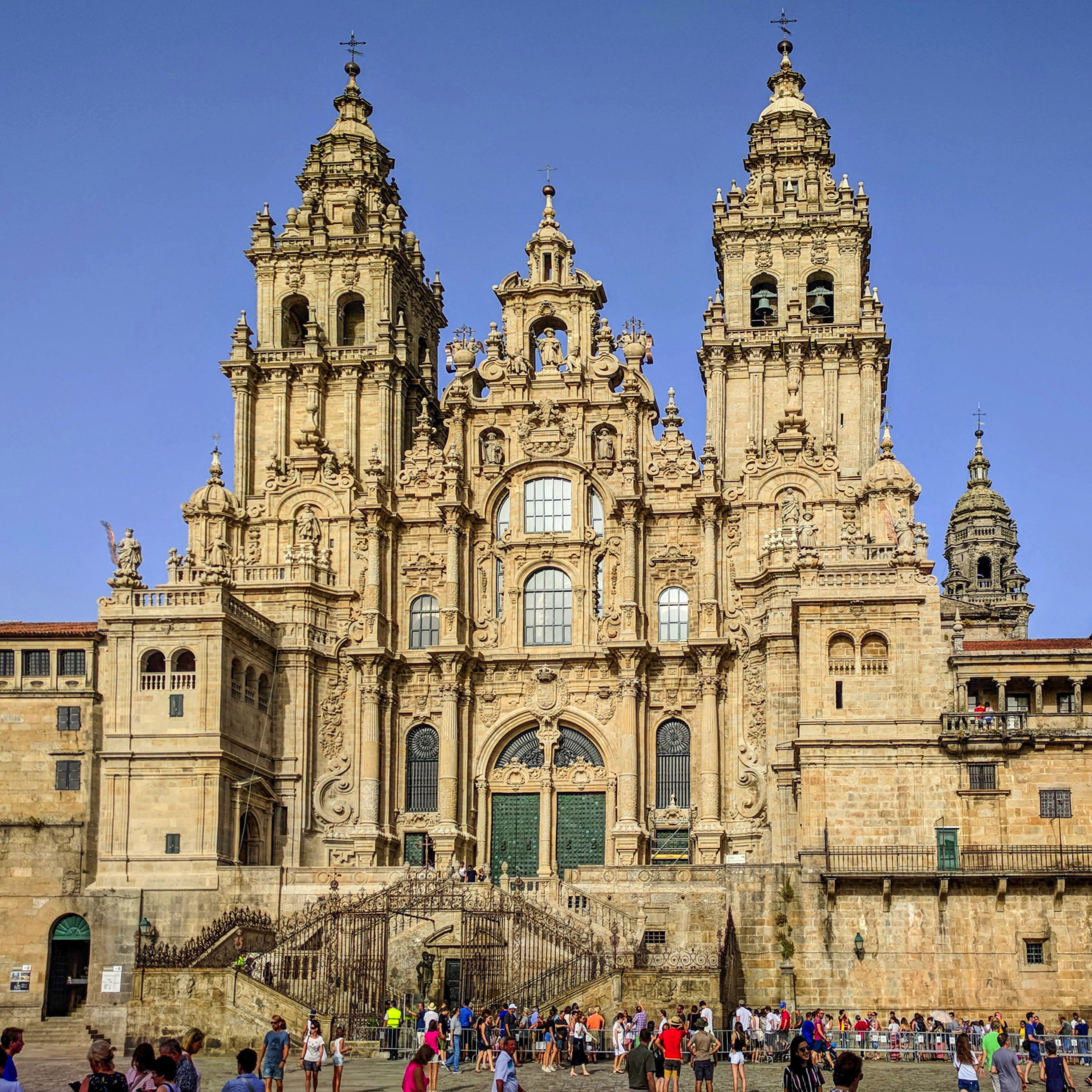
Santiago de Compostela Cathedral, in Spain

Christianity is the predominant religion in Europe. Christianity has been practiced in Europe since the first century, and a number of the Pauline Epistles were addressed to Christians living in Greece, as well as other parts of the Roman Empire.

According to a 2010 study by the Pew Research Center, 76.2% of the European population identified themselves as Christians, and in their 2025 report that figure was at 67%.

As of 2010, Roman Catholics were the largest Christian group in Europe, accounting for more than 48% of European Christians. The second-largest Christian group in Europe were the Orthodox, who made up 32% of European Christians. About 19% of European Christians were part of the mainline Protestant tradition. Russia is the largest Christian country in Europe by population, followed by Germany and Italy.

Since at least the legalization of Christianity by the Roman Emperor Constantine in the 4th century, Europe has been an important centre of Christian culture, even though the religion was inherited from the Middle East and important Christian communities have thrived outside Europe such as Oriental Orthodoxy and the Church of the East since the time of Christ. Christian culture has been an important force in Western civilization, influencing the course of philosophy, art, and science.

== Overview ==
Historically, Europe has been the center and "cradle of Christian civilization". Christianity played a prominent role in the development of the European culture and identity. Europe has a rich Christian culture, especially as numerous saints and martyrs and almost all the popes were European themselves. All of the Roman Catholic popes from 741 to 2013 were from Europe. Europe brought together many of the Christian holy sites and heritage and religious centers.

== History ==
=== Early history ===
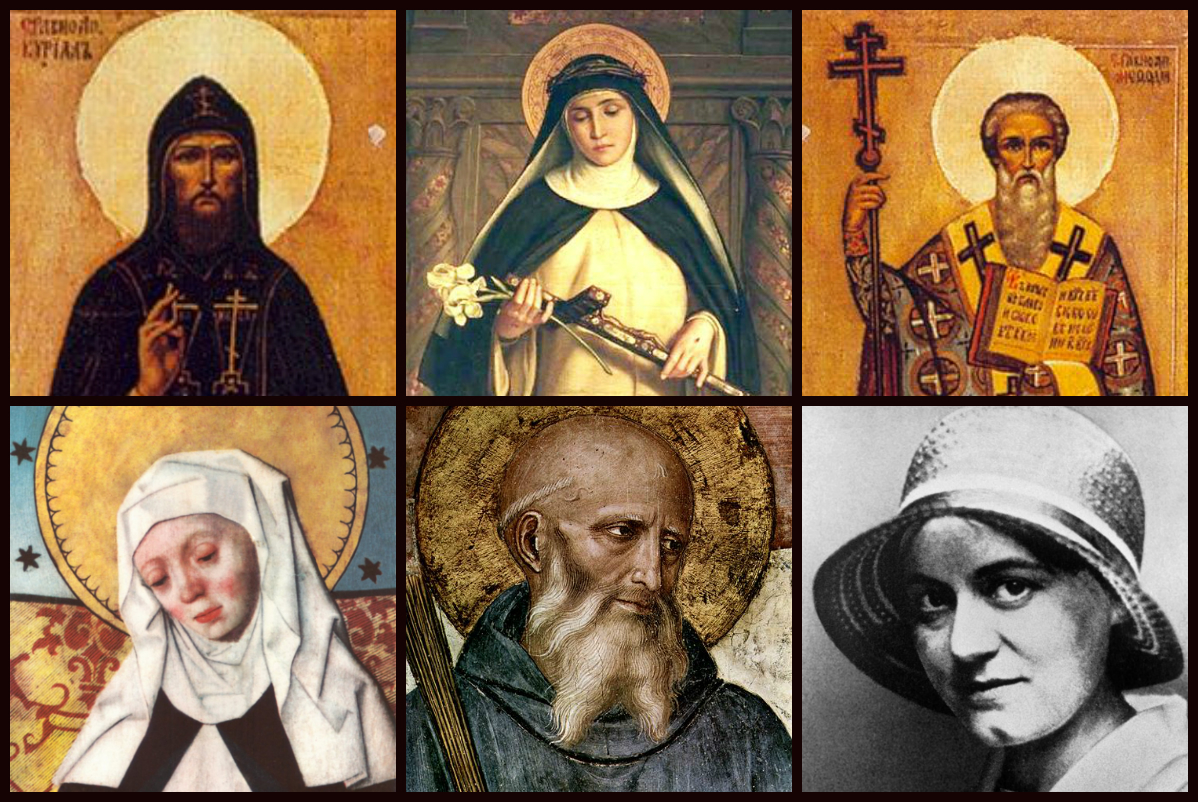
Patron saints of Europe.

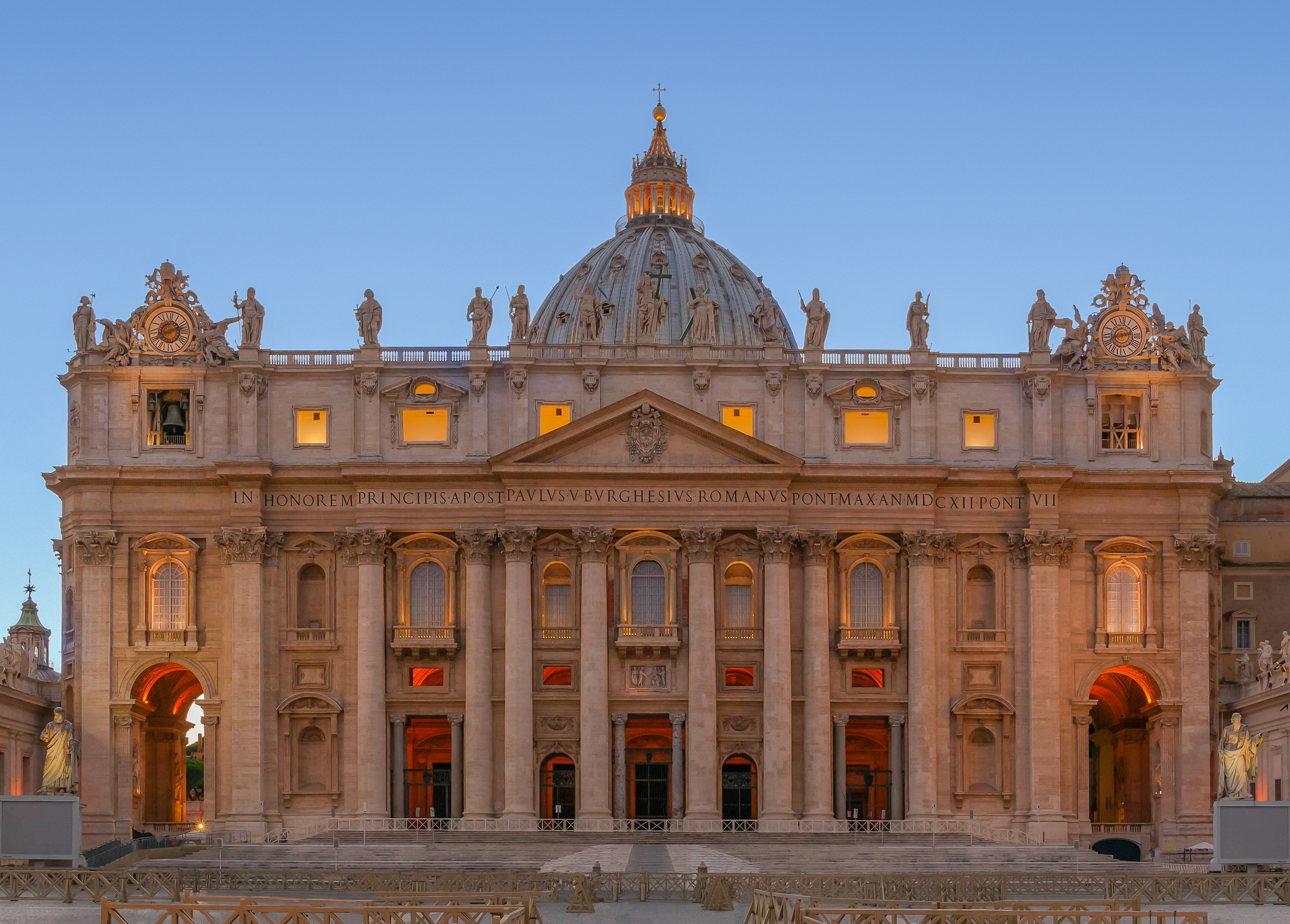
St. Peter's Basilica

Historians believe that St. Paul wrote his first epistle to the Christians of Thessaloniki (Thessalonians) around AD 52. His Epistle to the Galatians was perhaps written even earlier, between AD 48 and 50. Other epistles written by Paul were directed to Christians living in Greece (1 Corinthians, 2 Corinthians, Philemon, Philippians, 2 Thessalonians) and Rome (Romans) between the 50s and 70s of the first century.

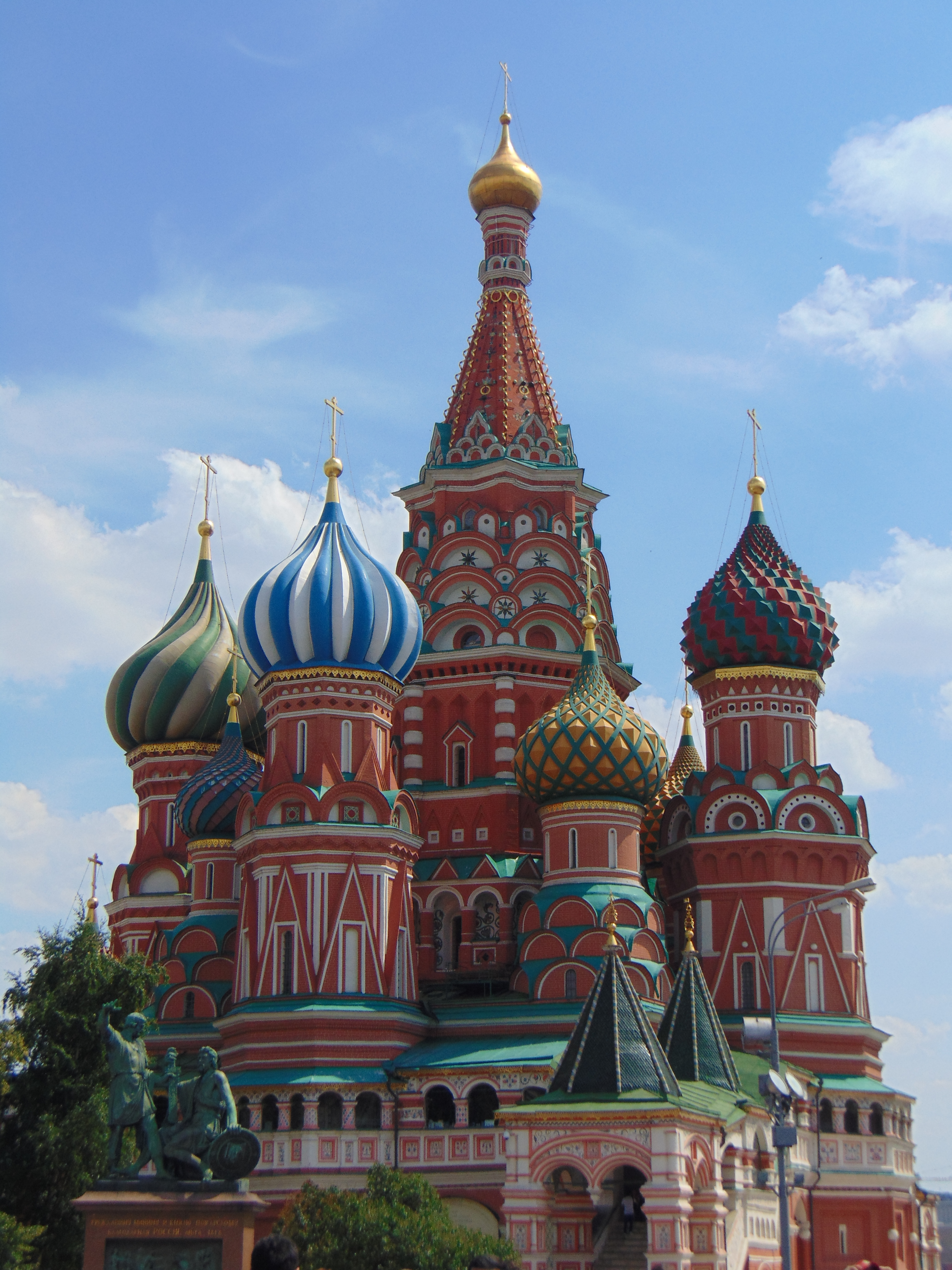
Saint Basil's Cathedral in Moscow

The Record of Saint Dorotheus (Bishop of Tyre) is that the Church at Tyre sent Aristobulus (of the seventy) to Britain as bishop in AD 37. The Church seems to have been begun by him around the Bristol Channel area and 150 years later we have names of bishops recorded. By AD 550 there are recorded 120 bishops spread throughout the British Isles. Before they were a recognized religion in Europe, Christians faced punishment and persecution for their first centuries in Europe, especially during the first. They were targeted by Emperor Nero who is rumored to have ordered the colossal fire in Rome, destroying the city in AD 64. The reasons for their persecution vary. Many believe Christians to have been scapegoats, when the real issues were local or political.

Armenia was the first state in the world to adopt Christianity as its state religion in AD 301. The oldest state-built church in the world, Etchmiadzin Cathedral, was built between AD 301–303. It is the seat of the Armenian Apostolic Church. The Roman Empire officially adopted Christianity in AD 380. During the Early Middle Ages, most of Europe underwent Christianization, a process essentially complete with the Baltic Christianization in the 15th century. The emergence of the notion of "Europe" or the "Western World" is intimately connected with the idea of "Christendom", especially since Christianity in the Middle East was marginalized by the rise of Islam from the 7th century, a constellation that led to the Crusades, which although unsuccessful militarily were an important step in the emergence of a religious identity of Europe. At all times, traditions of folk religion existed largely independent from official denominations or dogmatic theology.

From the Middle Ages onwards, as the centralized Roman power waned in southern and central Europe, the dominance of the Catholic Church was the only consistent force in Western Europe.

Movements in art and philosophy, such as the Humanist movement of the Renaissance and the Scholastic movement of the High Middle Ages, were motivated by a drive to connect Catholicism with Greek thought imported by Christian pilgrims.

=== East–West Schism and Protestant Reformation ===
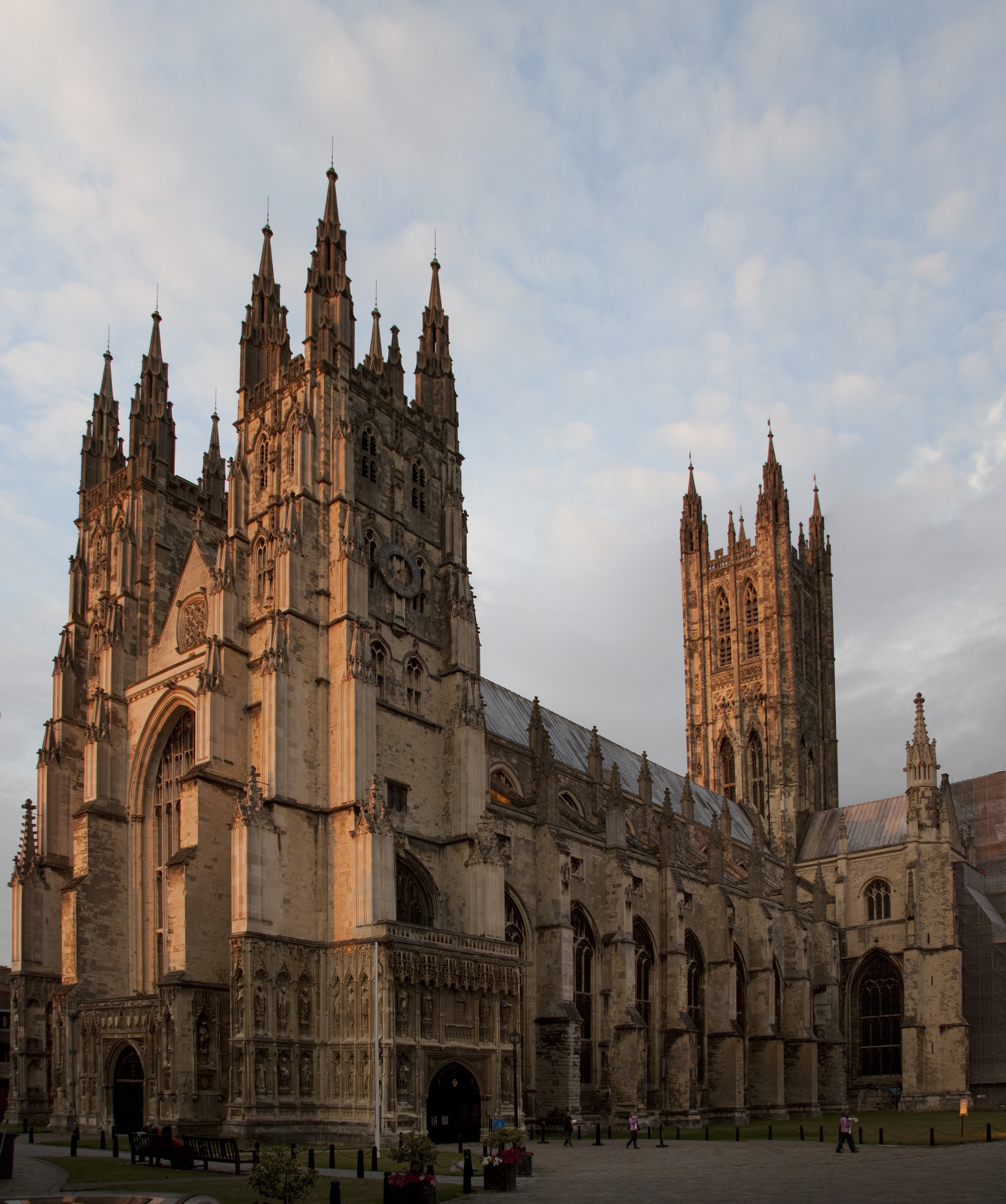
Canterbury Cathedral is the cathedral of the Archbishop of Canterbury of the Protestant Church of England

The East–West Schism of the 11th century and the Protestant Reformation of the 16th divided "Christendom" into hostile factions. Following the Age of Enlightenment of the 18th century, atheism and agnosticism became widespread in Western Europe. 19th-century Orientalism contributed to a certain popularity of Buddhism, and the 20th century brought increasing syncretism, New Age and various new religious movements divorcing spirituality from inherited traditions for many Europeans. The latest history brought increased secularisation, as well as religious pluralism.

According to Scholars, in 2017, Europe's population was 77.8% Christian (up from 74.9% 1970), these changes were largely result of the collapse of Communism and switching to Christianity in the former Soviet Union and Eastern Bloc countries.

== Cultural influences ==
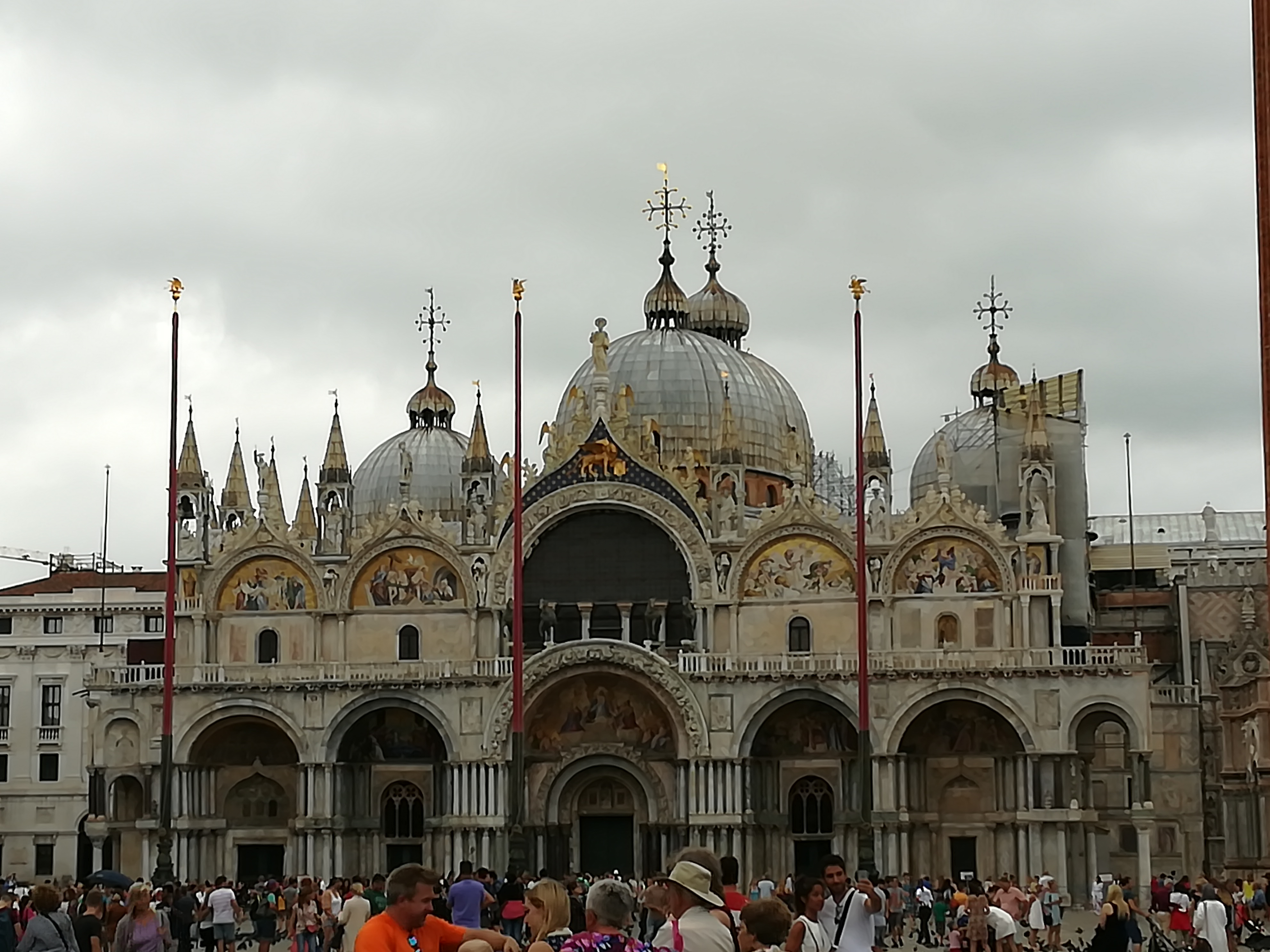
St Mark's Basilica in Venice, a mixture of Italian and Byzantine features

Western culture, throughout most of its history, has been nearly equivalent to Christian culture, and many of the population of the Western hemisphere could broadly be described as cultural Christians. The notion of "Europe" and the "Western World" has been intimately connected with the concept of "Christianity and Christendom" many even attribute Christianity for being the link that created a unified European identity.

Though Western culture contained several polytheistic religions during its early years under the Greek and Roman empires, as the centralized Roman power waned, the dominance of the Catholic Church was the only consistent force in Europe. Until the Age of Enlightenment, Christian culture guided the course of philosophy, literature, art, music and science. Christian disciplines of the respective arts have subsequently developed into Christian philosophy, Christian art, Christian music, Christian literature etc.

Christianity had a significant impact on education and science and medicine as the church created the bases of the Western system of education, and was the sponsor of founding universities in the Western world as the university is generally regarded as an institution that has its origin in the Medieval Christian setting. Many clerics made significant contributions to science and Jesuits, in particular, made numerous significant contributions to the development of science. The Civilizing influence of Christianity (in Europe) includes social welfare, founding hospitals, economics, politics, architecture, literature and family life.

Although the Protestant Reformation was a religious movement, it also had a strong impact on all other aspects of European life: marriage and family, education, the humanities and sciences, the political and social order, the economy, and the arts.

== Denominations ==
Distribution of Christians in Europe by denomination
1. Catholicism (46.3%)
2. Eastern Orthodoxy (35.4%)
3. Protestantism (17.8%)
4. Other (0.50%)

The map above shows plurality religious denomination by country as of 2020 according to the World Religion Database. Protestantism 90 - 99% 80 - 89% 70 - 79% 60 - 69% 50 - 59% 40 - 49% 30 - 39% 20 - 29% Catholicism 90 - 99% 80 - 89% 70 - 79% 60 - 69% 50 - 59% 40 - 49% 30 - 39% 20 - 29% Eastern Orthodoxy 90 - 99% 80 - 89% 70 - 79% 60 - 69% 50 - 59% 40 - 49% 30 - 39% 20 - 29%

- Catholicism: European countries with significant or majority Catholic populations are Andorra, Austria, Belarus (western), Belgium, Bosnia and Herzegovina (central and southwestern part), Croatia, France, Germany (western and southern regions), Hungary, Republic of Ireland, Italy, Latvia (the Latgale region), Liechtenstein, Lithuania, Luxembourg, Malta, Monaco, Netherlands (eastern and southern regions), Poland, Portugal, San Marino, Slovakia, Slovenia, Spain, Switzerland (central and southern regions), Ukraine (western part) and Vatican City. There is also large Catholic minority in Albania (10–15%). In the Czech Republic and the United Kingdom, Catholics comprise roughly 10% of the population. In Serbia and Romania, Catholics constitute over 5% of the overall population.
  - Eastern Catholic Churches are found mostly in Ukraine (western), Italy (southern), Slovakia (eastern), Romania and Hungary. Small numbers of adherents exist in Russia, Serbia, Poland, France (especially Corsica), North Macedonia, and Greece. Most Catholics in Scandinavia are the result of immigration from other countries in Europe and elsewhere.
- Eastern Orthodoxy: European countries or areas with significant Eastern Orthodox populations are Belarus, Bulgaria, Bosnia and Herzegovina (northern and eastern parts), Cyprus, Georgia, Greece, North Macedonia, Moldova, Montenegro, Romania, Russia, Serbia, Ukraine, and the European part of Kazakhstan. Eastern Orthodox Christians form large minorities in Albania and Estonia. (Note: As the denomination surpassed Lutheranism in this country, this has been the case since the early 2010s) Small minorities of Eastern Orthodox Christians live in Finland (especially Karelia), Lithuania, Armenia, and eastern Poland.
- Oriental Orthodoxy: Armenia has a large Oriental Orthodox majority.
- Protestantism: European countries or areas with significant Protestant populations are Denmark, Finland, Germany (central, eastern and northern regions), United Kingdom, Iceland, Netherlands (central and northern regions), Norway, Sweden, and Switzerland (except the southern part). There are significant Protestant minorities in Estonia, Latvia, France, the northeastern Piedmont region of Italy, Slovakia, the western and southern parts of Germany, eastern Hungary, the Czech Republic, Poland, Serbia, and Romania. There are an estimated sixty nine million Evangelicals, Pentecostals and Charismatic Christians in Europe.
  - Anglicanism (or Episcopalianism, in Scotland) is the largest denomination in the United Kingdom (England and Wales), with a large minority in Northern Ireland, and small numbers in the Republic of Ireland, Malta, Scotland, Spain and Portugal. Communities also exist throughout Europe, particularly in large cities and other regions with British expatriate communities (see Diocese in Europe). The US-based Episcopal Church has long had a presence in Western Europe (see Convocation of Episcopal Churches in Europe). There have been up to thirty million Anglicans in England.
  - Calvinism in forms of Continental Reformed Church, Presbyterianism and Congregationalism is predominant in North and West Switzerland, in the Netherlands, and there are minorities in Germany, Hungary and France. It is the main religion in Scotland and a large minority in Northern Ireland, and smaller numbers in England and Wales, Ireland and Malta. There are an estimated ten million Reformed and Presbyterian Christians in Europe.
  - Lutheranism is prevalent in Norway, Sweden, Denmark, Iceland, Finland, and Germany (northern and western regions). There are also minorities throughout Europe, including Estonia, Latvia, Hungary and Alsace (France), with smaller numbers in Poland, the Netherlands, Romania (among ethnic Germans and Hungarians), Switzerland, and the United Kingdom. There have been up to sixty million Lutherans in Europe.
  - Note that most Calvinist and Lutheran churches in mainland Europe have merged to united Protestant churches (e.g. in Belgium, France, Germany, the Netherlands, Switzerland). Exclusive Lutheranism still prevails in the Nordic countries. There are an estimated twelve million members of United Churches in Europe.
  - Methodism is an important minority denomination in Great Britain (especially Wales) and parts of Northern Ireland.
  - There are an estimated twenty million Christians unaffiliated from any denomination.

== Christian symbolism in Europe ==
=== National flags with a Christian symbolism ===
==== Christian cross ====
Flag of the Kingdom of Denmark
(Nordic cross)

Flag of Finland
(Nordic cross)

Flag of Georgia
(Jerusalem cross)

Flag of Greece
(Greek cross)

Flag of Hungary (state)
(Patriarchal cross and the Crown of Saint Stephen with a Latin cross)

Flag of Iceland
(Nordic cross)

Flag of Liechtenstein
(Latin cross)

Flag of Malta
(George cross)

Flag of Moldova
(Orthodox cross)

Flag of Montenegro
(Orthodox cross and the globus cruciger)

Flag of the Kingdom of Norway
(Nordic cross)

Flag of the Order of Malta
(St George Cross)

Flag of San Marino
(Latin cross)

Flag of Serbia
(Serbian cross)

Flag of Slovakia
(Patriarchal cross)

Flag of the Kingdom of Spain
(Latin cross)

Flag of the Kingdom of Sweden
(Nordic cross)

Flag of Switzerland
(Greek cross)

Flag of the United Kingdom
(St. George's, St. Andrew's, and St. Patrick's crosses)

Flag of Vatican City
(Latin cross, the Keys of Heaven and the Papal tiara)

==== Other Christian symbolism ====
Flag of Andorra
(Bishop's mitre and a crozier)

Flag of Armenia
(Red symbolizes the maintenance of the Christian faith)

Flag of Ireland
(Green symbolizes the Catholic majority and orange symbolizes the Protestant minority)

Flag of Portugal
(Five Holy Wounds)

=== Coat of arms with a Christian symbolism ===
Coat of arms of Andorra
(Bishop's mitre and a crozier)

Coat of arms of Armenia
(Christian cross)

Coat of arms of Belgium
(Christian cross)

Coat of arms of Bulgaria
(Christian cross)

Coat of arms of Cyprus
(White dove with olive branch)

Coat of arms of Denmark
(Christian cross)

Coat of arms of Georgia
(Christian cross)

Coat of arms of Greece
(Christian cross)

Coat of arms of Hungary
(Christian cross and the Crown of Saint Stephen)

Coat of arms of Iceland
(Christian cross)

Coat of arms of Liechtenstein
(Christian cross)

Coat of arms of Lithuania
(Christian cross)

Coat of arms of Luxembourg
(Christian cross)

Coat of arms of Malta
(Christian cross)

Coat of arms of Moldova
(Christian cross)

Coat of arms of Monaco
(Christian cross)

Coat of arms of Montenegro
(Christian cross and the globus cruciger)

Coat of arms of Norway
(Christian cross)

Coat of arms of the Netherlands
(Christian cross)

Coat of arms of the Order of Malta
(Christian cross)

Coat of arms of Portugal
(Five Holy Wounds)

Coat of arms of Romania
(Christian cross)

Coat of arms of Russia
(Christian cross and the globus cruciger)

Coat of arms of San Marino
(Christian cross)

Coat of arms of Serbia
(Christian cross)

Coat of arms of Slovakia
(Christian cross)

Coat of arms of Spain
(Christian cross)

Coat of arms of Sweden
(Christian cross)

Coat of arms of Switzerland
(Christian cross)

Coat of arms of the United Kingdom
(Christian cross)

Coat of arms of Vatican City
(Christian cross, the Keys of Heaven and the Papal tiara)

== See also ==
- Antemurale Christianitatis
- Catholic Church in Europe
- Church attendance
- Conference of European Churches
- European Christian Political Party (2002–present)
- Religion in Europe
- Religion in the European Union
- Christianity by country
- Catholicism by country
- Eastern Orthodoxy by country
- Oriental Orthodoxy by country
- Protestantism by country
- Religion in North America
- Religion in South America
- List of religious populations
- Major world religions
