= Catholic Church in the Nordic countries =

The Catholic Church in the Nordic countries was the only Christian church in that region before the Reformation in the 16th century. Since then, Scandinavia has been a mostly non-Catholic (Lutheran) region and the position of Nordic Catholics for many centuries after the Reformation was very difficult due to legislation outlawing Catholicism. However, the Catholic population of the Nordic countries has seen some growth in the region in recent years, particularly in Norway, in large part due to immigration and to a lesser extent conversions among the native population.

== History ==
In Sweden, a patent letter of tolerance rescinded some of the anti-Catholic laws and Catholics were once again allowed to settle and practice their religion in 1781 under Gustavus III. The Vicariate Apostolic of Sweden was founded in 1783. It was elevated to a diocese in 1953.

The Norwegian Constitution of 1814 denied Jews and Catholics (particularly Jesuits) entrance in Norway. It also stated that attendance in a Lutheran church was compulsory. The ban on Catholics was lifted in 1842, and the ban on Jews was lifted in 1851. At first, there were multiple restrictions on the practice of Catholicism; only foreign citizens were allowed to practice, and after the first post-reformation parish was founded in 1843, Catholics were only allowed to celebrate Mass in this one parish. In 1845, with the passing of the Dissenter Act, most restrictions on non-Lutheran Christian denominations were lifted, and Catholics were now allowed to practice their religion freely and invite most religious orders to settle in the country. However, members of the Society of Jesus would not be allowed to enter Norway until 1956.

== Notable Nordic Post-Reformation Catholics ==
- Christina, Queen of Sweden (1626–1689), her conversion led her to abdicate and move to Rome
- Anders Arborelius is the first ethnically Swedish Catholic bishop (1998) since the Reformation and the first Swedish cardinal ever, convert
- Count Nils Bielke (1706–1765), converted in Rome in 1731, and became a Roman senator and papal chamberlain, convert
- Saint Elizabeth Hesselblad (1870–1957), convert
- Czeslaw Kozon, Bishop of Copenhagen
- Halldór Laxness, Icelandic novelist; winner of 1955 Nobel Prize for Literature
- Janne Haaland Matláry, Norwegian international relations scholar, convert
- Helena Nyblom (1843–1926), Danish-born Swedish writer, convert
- Count Christopher de Paus (1862–1943), a Norwegian land owner who converted and became a papal chamberlain and Roman Count, convert
- Baron Wilhelm Wedel-Jarlsberg (1852–1909), Norwegian nobleman and papal chamberlain, convert
- Ven. Charles Schilling (1835–1907), Norwegian barnabite priest and candidate for canonization
- Brita Collett Paus, the founder of Fransiskushjelpen, convert
- Sven Stolpe
- Queen Josephine (1807–1876), queen consort of Sweden and Norway
- Ulf Ekman, former Word of life pastor and founder, convert
- Jón Sveinsson, a Jesuit author from Iceland; wrote in Icelandic, but lived in France, convert
- Olaf Thommessen, Oslo politician and businessman
- Stian Berger Røsland, Oslo politician and former governing mayor of Oslo
- Blessed Niels Steensen (1638–1686), Danish scientist and bishop
- Birgitta Trotzig
- Sigrid Undset (1882–1949), Norwegian writer, convert
- Gunnel Vallquist (1918–2016), Swedish writer, critic and translator, former member of the Swedish Academy, convert
- Johannes Jorgensen (1866–1956), Danish writer, biographer of Francis of Assisi

== See also ==
- Anti-Catholicism in Norway
- Catholic Church in Sweden
- Christianization of Scandinavia
- Conventicle Act (Denmark-Norway)
- Conventicle Act (Sweden)
- Dissenter Acts (Sweden)
- List of Catholic dioceses in Nordic Europe
- Lists of Roman Catholics
- Northern Crusades
- Reformation in Denmark-Norway and Holstein
- Reformation in Sweden
- Roman Catholicism in Denmark
- Roman Catholicism in the Faroe Islands
- Roman Catholicism in Finland
- Roman Catholicism in Iceland
- Roman Catholicism in Norway
