= Catholic music =

Catholic music may refer to:

- Gregorian chant
- Contemporary Catholic liturgical music
- List of Catholic musicians
