= List of Chinese Catholics =

This is a list of Chinese Catholics in communion with Rome. It does not include members of the Chinese Patriotic Catholic Association, unless they are also recognized by the Holy See, but for cultural reasons does include Taiwanese persons.

== Catholics of dynastic China ==
This concerns those who lived most or all of their life before the Xinhai Revolution.

- Martyr Saints of China - Although a few are from the Republican period.
- Lucy Yi Zhenmei - Martyr saint

=== Clergy ===
- Luo Wenzao - first Chinese bishop, Apostolic Vicar of Nanjing
- Zheng Manuo - first Chinese Jesuit, first Chinese international student in Europe
- Michael Shen Fu-Tsung - Jesuit who visited Europe
- Louis Fan - priest, first Chinese to visit Europe and the Americas and return to China, writing on his travels
- Wu Li - Landscape painter, poet, and Jesuit.
- Ma Xiangbo - Jesuit, scholar, and educator.
- He Tianzhang - Jesuit, resisted the ban on Chinese Rites.

=== Courtiers ===
- The Three Pillars of Chinese Catholicism: Xu Guangqi, Lǐ Zhīzǎo, and Yáng Tíngyú - ministers of the Ming court
- Li Yingshi - A Ming Chinese military officer and mathematician.
- Sun Yuanhua - Ming governor and mathematician
- Zheng Zhilong - Fujian warlord turned admiral
- Charles Yu Hsingling - Qing Railway engineer and diplomat to France
- Xu Jingcheng - Qing Minister of the Zongli Yamen
- Empress Dowager Ma - Mother of Yongli Emperor
- Empress Dowager Wang (Southern Ming) - Principal consort of the father of the Yongli emperor
- Empress Wang (Southern Ming) - Consort of the Yongli emperor
- Princess Der Ling - court lady, author of several memoirs, books, and magazine articles

=== Cultural figures ===
- Arcadio Huang - Jesuit-trained scholar, visited and worked in Europe
- Candida Xu - Granddaughter of Xu Guangqi, prominent patroness of Catholic missionaries
- Jiao Bingzhen - Painter and astronomer.
- Ying Lianzhi ‐ Manchu Bannerman, educator and newspaper editor

== Catholics of modern China ==
=== Clergy ===
==== Cardinals ====
- Ignatius Kung Pin-Mei - A bishop of the Roman Catholic Diocese of Shanghai who became a Cardinal in pectore
- Thomas Tien Ken-sin - He was elevated to Cardinal Priest of Santa Maria in Via by Pope Pius XII in the consistory of February 18, 1946.
- John Tong Hon - Titular Archpriest of the church of Regina Apostolorum in Rome.
- John Wu - Associated to the Roman Catholic Diocese of Hong Kong.
- Paul Yü Pin - Previously an archbishop of Nanking.
- Joseph Zen - He had been the sixth bishop of the Roman Catholic Diocese of Hong Kong.

==== Archbishops and bishops ====
- Han Dingxiang - An underground bishop of Yongnian detained for much of his ministry for his loyalty to the Vatican as opposed to the Chinese government-controlled Roman Catholic Church.
- Matthew Kia Yen-wen - An archbishop emeritus of Taipei,
- Joseph Meng Ziwen - A bishop who spent time in a labor camp, was also recognized by the government as a priest of the Chinese Patriotic Catholic Association.
- John Chen Shi-zhong - A bishop of the Roman Catholic Diocese of Suifu.
- Dominic Tang - Last archbishop of the Roman Catholic Archdiocese of Guangzhou to be recognized by the Holy See.
- Leon Yao Liang - A bishop of the Roman Catholic Diocese of Xiwanzi.
- Peter Zhang Bairen - An unofficial bishop of the Roman Catholic Diocese of Hanyang.

==== Priests ====
- Thomas CJ Cian ( 1823-1895 ) : pioneer Chinese priest of California, USA
- Beda Chang - Jesuit killed by the Communists.
- Nicholas Kao Se Tseien - Hong Kong priest known for his longevity.
- Pierre-Celestin Lu Zhengxiang - Premier of China and convert who attended the Paris Peace Conference of 1919 and later became a Benedictine priest.
- Lawrence Zhang Wen-Chang - An Apostolic Administrator sent to the Laogai system by the People's Republic of China.

==== Nuns ====
- Beatrice Leung - Sister of the Precious Blood of Hong Kong, and Professor at Wenzao Ursuline University of Languages.

=== Entertainers ===
==== Musicians ====
- James Wong - Singer-songwriter, actor, columnist, and film director.

=== Politicians ===
- He Yingqin - Premier of China
- Eugene Chen - Foreign Minister of China
- Chan Kwok-keung - Former Member of the Legislative Council of Hong Kong.
- Paul Chan - Previous head of the New Macau Association.
- Audrey Eu - Former Member of the Legislative Council of Hong Kong.
- Carrie Lam - Former Chief Executive of Hong Kong
- Martin Lee - Founding chairman of the Democratic Party of Hong Kong.
- Antonio Ng - Member of the Legislative Assembly of Macau.
- Donald Tsang - The second Chief Executive and President of the Executive Council of Hong Kong from 2005 to 2012.
- John Tsang - Former Financial Secretary of Hong Kong.

=== Writers ===
- Su Xuelin - Novelist and scholar whose autobiographical Ji Xin (Heart of the Thorn Bush, 1929) discusses her conversion to Catholicism.
- John C. H. Wu - Diplomat, jurist, and writer of works such as From Confucianism to Catholicism and Chinese Humanism and Christian spirituality.

=== Others ===
- Ying Qianli - ethnic Manchu university professor, World War II resistance activist
- Nadine Hwang - Chinese Air Force female pilot, honorary Colonel
