= List of Catholic dioceses in Nordic Europe =

The Catholic Church in Nordic Europe has 5 dioceses and two territorial prelatures. All of these territories are immediately subject to the Holy See, with no intermediating archdiocese.

The area of the Nordic Bishops' Conference holds almost 250,000 Catholics in 2023.

== List of dioceses ==
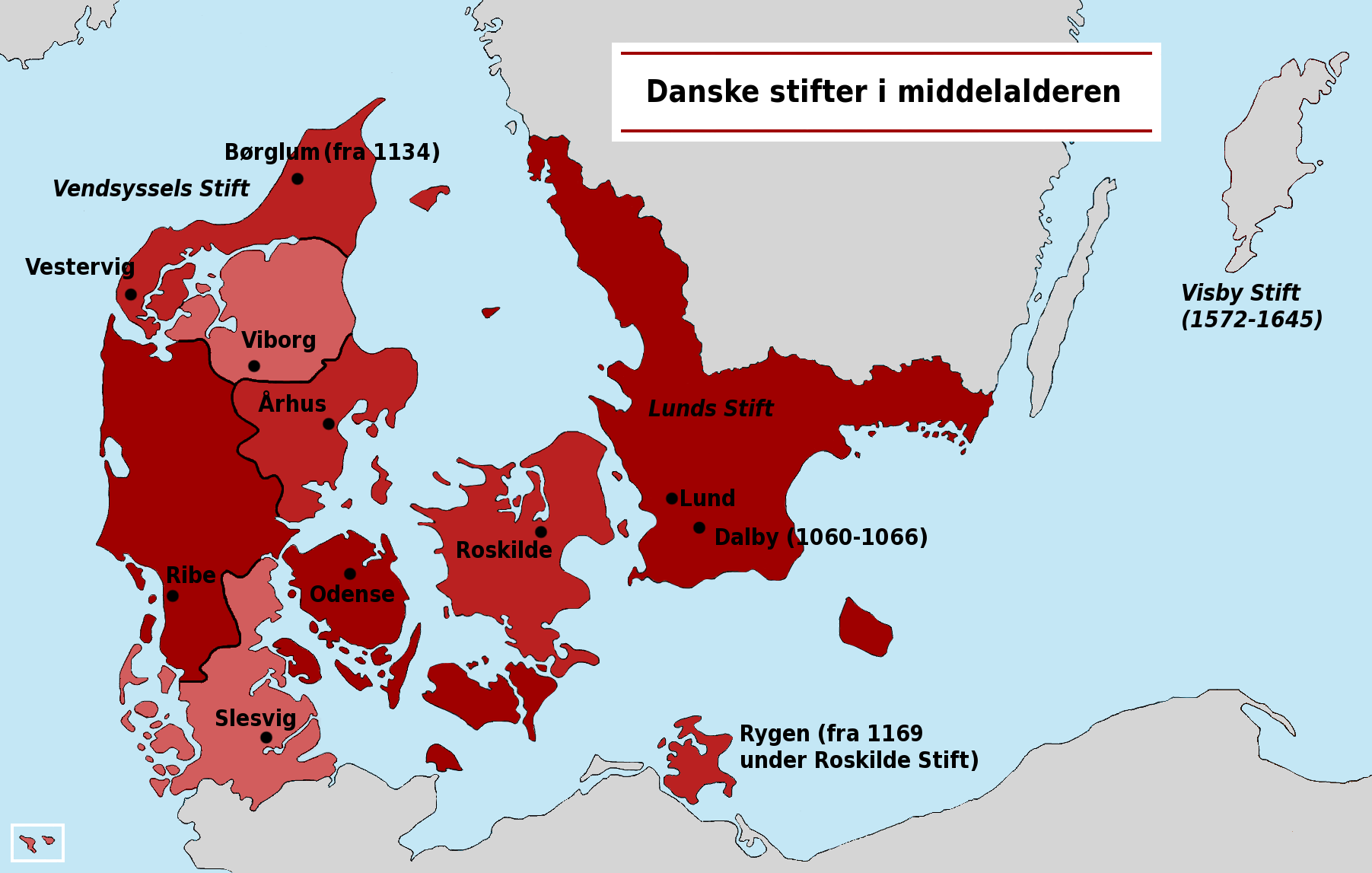
Medieval Danish dioceses

- Diocese of Copenhagen
- Diocese of Helsinki
- Diocese of Oslo
- Diocese of Reykjavik
- Diocese of Stockholm
- Territorial Prelature of Trondheim
- Territorial Prelature of Tromsø

== See also ==
- Catholic Church in the Nordic countries
