= Herbert Cosgrove =

Australian singer and composer

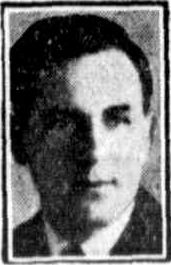
- Herbert Cosgrove 1931

Background information
- Born: Melbourne, Australia
- Died: 3 October 1953
- Occupation(s): Baritone, composer
- Years active: 1910–1953

Herbert Cosgrove (died 1953) was a well known Australian baritone and composer of light ephemera. Cosgrove was married.

== Career ==
Cosgrove used his position as a well-known entertainer to work as a vocal accompanist for Aeolian gramophone, and Marcus and Clark music store and later at Nicholson's Music Publisher in Sydney.

At the height of his career, he toured the world and his magnum opus "Mothers Hands" was featured at the London Palladium by Singer Essie Ackland

== Background ==
Herbert grew up in Botany Bay area. In his youth he narrowly escaped being killed by his own horse.

He was a Catholic and performed ecclesiastic works at St Mary's Basilica in Sydney. He also played organ Later in life he lived in Rose Bay and collected art.

== Works ==
- Nobody Knows But Mother – Mother's Day Song dedicated to Dusolina Giannini
- When I am grown
- Mother's hands – featured at the London Palladium with Essie Ackland
- Night thoughts
- Here in this solemn hour
- Summertime in Devon
