= Wilhelm Wedel-Jarlsberg =

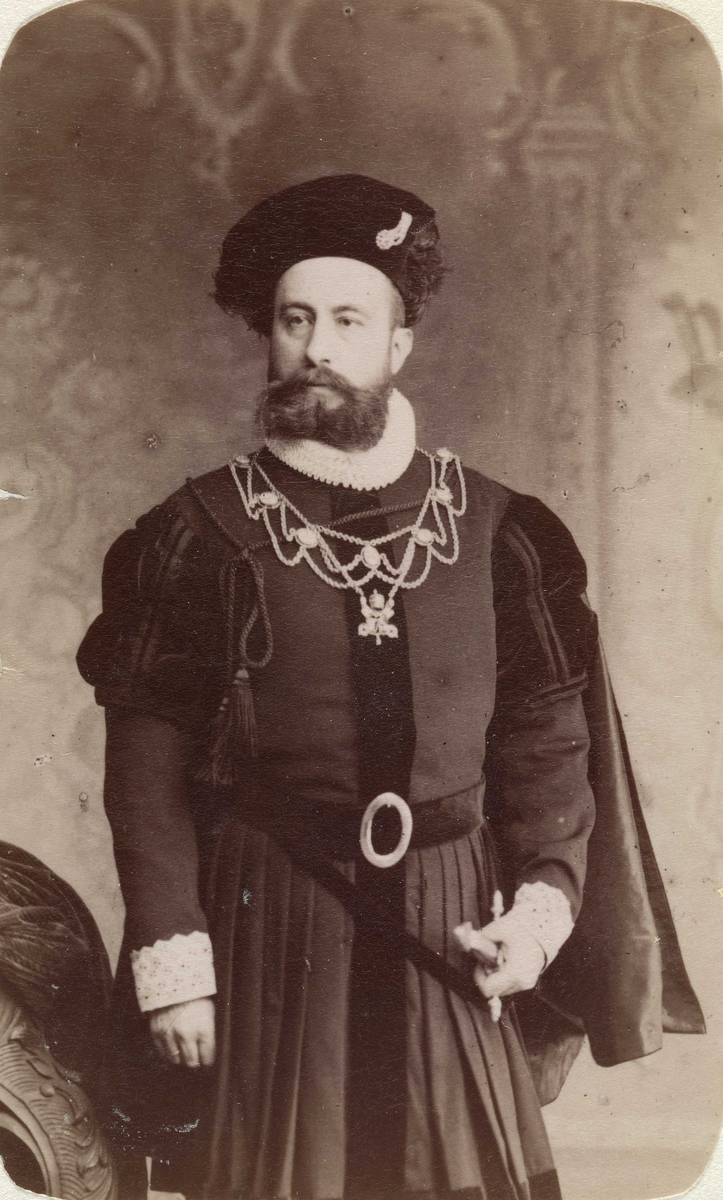
Wilhelm Wedel-Jarlsberg in the court dress of a papal chamberlain

Wilhelm Christian Wedel-Jarlsberg (February 20, 1852 at Vækerø Manor – September 16, 1909 in Einsiedeln) was a Norwegian nobleman and papal chamberlain.

He was the son of Baron Herman Wedel-Jarlsberg (Bogstad) and Edle Frederikke Rosenørn Lehn. He became an officer of the Norwegian Army in 1875 and in 1879, he was appointed a chamberlain at the Norwegian court. After converting to Catholicism along with his wife, he had to leave the Lutheran court in Norway, but was appointed a papal chamberlain by Pope Leo XIII in 1882. He lived with his family at the Palazzo Farnese in Rome.
