= John-Paul Kaplan =

John-Paul Kaplan (born September 19, 1982), is an American record producer, composer and pianist.

== Early life ==
He was born to Slovak parents, Julius and Rozalia Kaplan on September 19, 1982. His interest in music was evident since his early childhood. He first started playing the organ at age five, then the piano at age seven.

John-Paul attended Northridge Prep High School where he accompanied the schools' musicals and drama productions. He continued studying classical music under the direction of Doreen Sterba DeZur. He was an outstanding pianist for his age, achieving top honors on the music competition circuit nationwide. He then studied biology, chemistry, and genetics at Elmhurst College.

== Career ==
In 2006, John-Paul founded Messenger Productions and Keys of Time Music. In that same year, Messenger Productions released his first album, "This Is The Day". It is a collection of captivating, uplifting, and inspiring hymns that people are familiar with.

"This Is The Day" won the Unity Award for Best Instrumental Album of the Year. The Unity Awards are given by the UCMVA. (The United Catholic Music Video Association) He was also nominated for Best New Artist of the Year and his song "Reflections of Prayer" was nominated as Best Song of the Year.

His next album released by Keys of Time Music was "My Favorite Piano, Volume 1". This album includes well loved piano classics arranged with modern touch and flair. It was nominated by the UCMVA for The Best Instrumental Album of the Year.

John-Paul performs and arranges all of his own music. His musical arrangements are fun and entertaining, receiving rave reviews worldwide. His music is considered by many to be like that of Roger Williams, Peter Nero, and Liberace.

He is a voting member of the Recording Academy, the Songwriters Guild, the National Music Association, and the Catholic Association of Musicians. Recently, he was distinguished as an International Recording Artist by Kawai Musical Instruments International. His music is distributed worldwide by Heartbeat Records.

== Personal life ==
Currently, John-Paul is working on new albums and is busy with concerts and appearances worldwide. He is an active participant committed to many important causes, including the support of pro-life causes and music education in schools. He speaks several languages including Spanish, Italian, Slovak, Czech, and Polish. In his free time, John-Paul enjoys culinary arts, sailing, basketball, traveling, and aviation.
