= Papal gentleman =

Lay attendant of the pope and his papal household in Vatican City

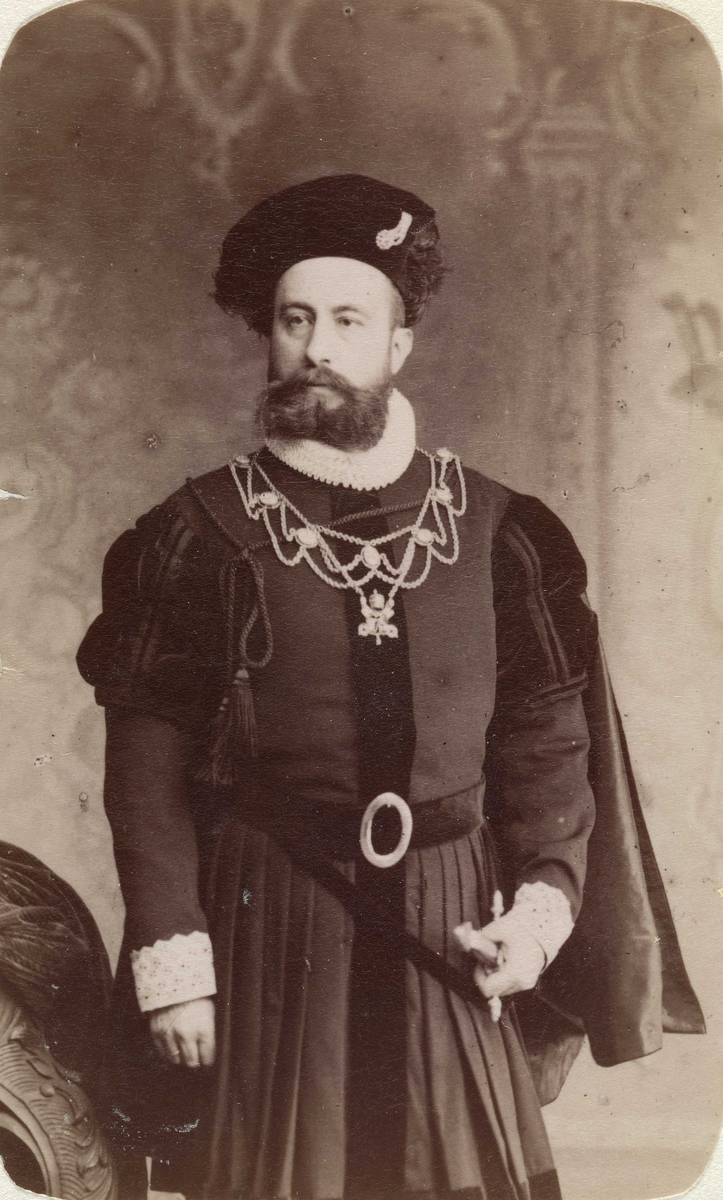
Baron Wilhelm Wedel-Jarlsberg wearing the court dress of a papal chamberlain

A papal gentleman, formally a Gentleman of His Holiness, is a lay attendant of the pope and his papal household in Vatican City. Papal gentlemen serve in the Apostolic Palace near St. Peter's Basilica in ceremonial positions, such as escorting dignitaries during state visits and other important occasions. It is a local name for the old court position of valet de chambre. To be appointed is an honor. The appointee is an unpaid volunteer.

== History ==
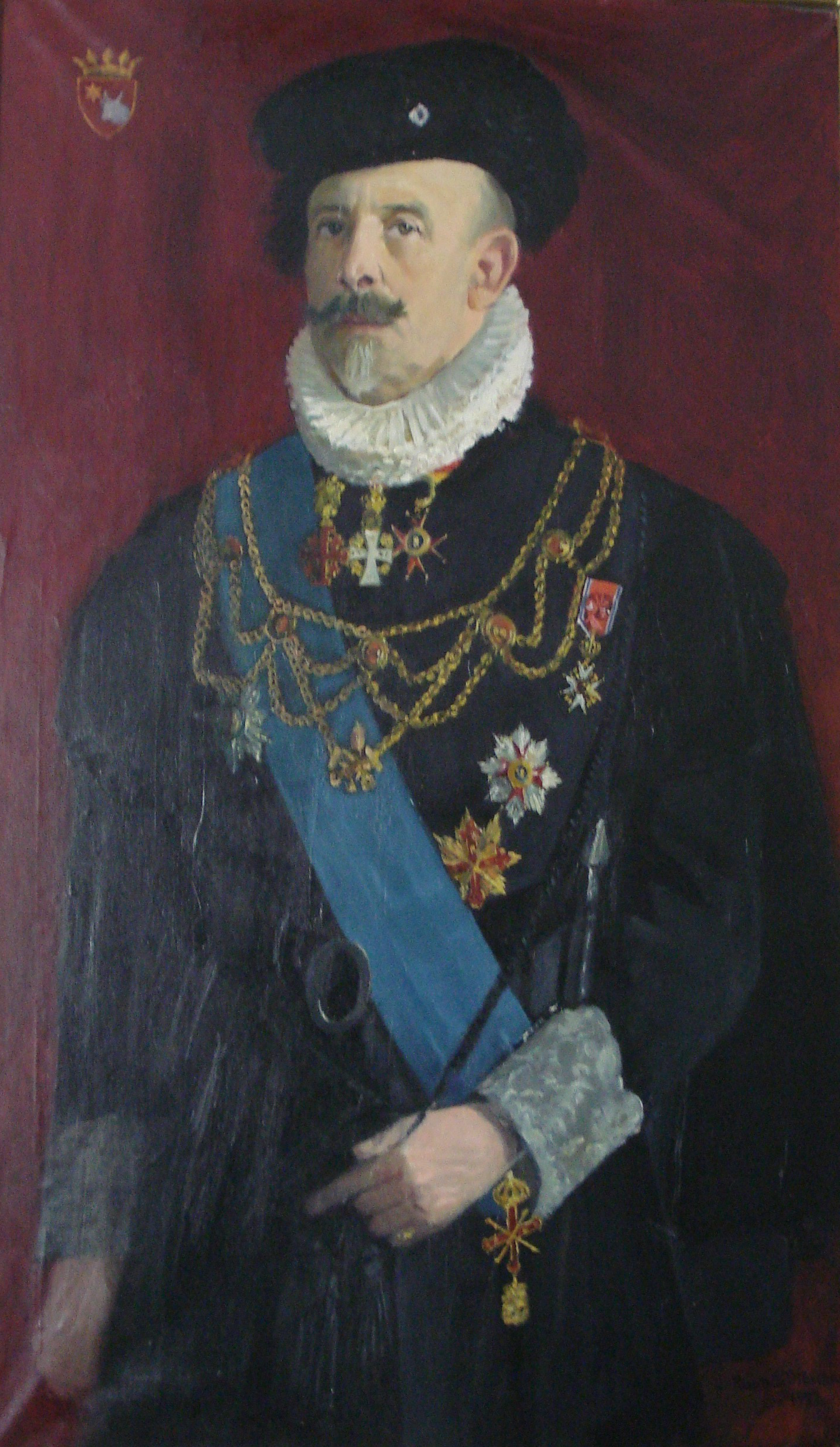
Count Christopher de Paus, wearing the formal court dress of a papal chamberlain of the sword and cape in Spanish Renaissance style, with a golden chain of office.

Papal Chamberlain was prior to 1968 a court title given by the pope to high-ranking clergy as well as laypersons, usually members of prominent Italian noble families. Many came from families that had long served the Papal Court over the course of several centuries, while others were appointed as a high honor, one of the highest the papacy conferred on Catholic laymen (often prominent politicians or wealthy philanthropists). They were originally selected from members of Italian royal and aristocratic families. They were members of the Papal Court and it was one of the highest honours that could be bestowed on a Catholic layman by the pope. Known as Chamberlain of the Sword and Cape (Cameriere Segreti di spada e cappa) when conferred upon laypersons, it was mostly an honorary position, but a chamberlain generally served the pope for at least one week per year during official liturgical or state ceremonies.

== Present day ==
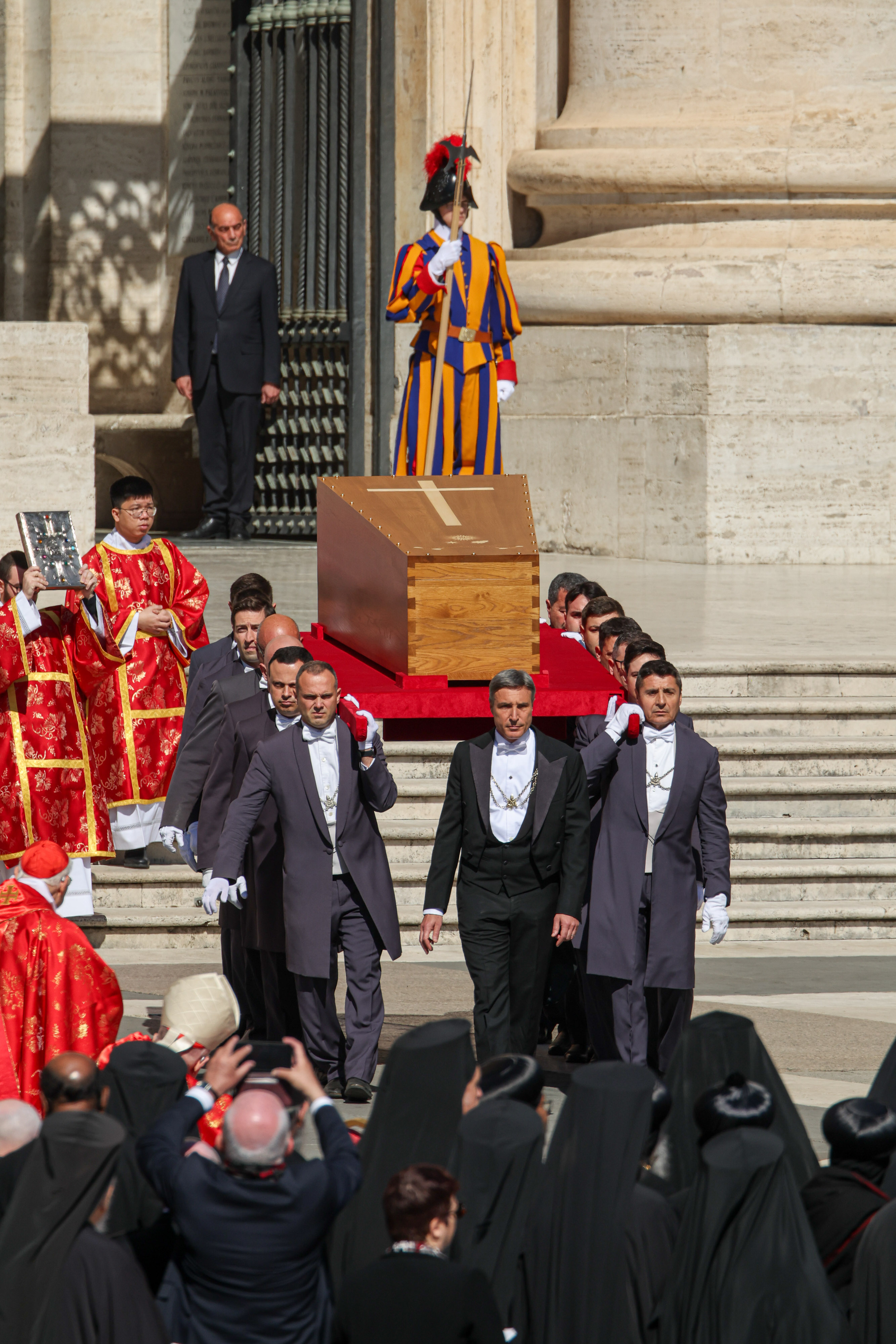
Papal gentlemen carrying the body of Pope Francis with his coffin during the funeral

The title was abolished in 1968 by Pope Paul VI and replaced with the designation "Gentleman of His Holiness" for laypersons.

Prior to Vatican II they provided personal assistance to the pope on formal state occasions as members of the Papal Court. The Gentlemen of His Holiness are under the Prefecture of the Papal Household. They participate in civil ceremonies and formal receptions for heads of state, heads of government and others. They welcome dignitaries such as ambassadors and ministers who come to the Vatican or Castel Gandolfo to present their credentials and serve as guides, escorting them to meetings with the pope.

Of approximately 150 gentlemen who generally serve for at least one week per year during official functions, about two dozen are on staff at a time. They assist at papal audiences, including the Wednesday General Audiences, often bringing children to the pope for a blessing. In addressing an audience with the papal gentlemen, Pope Francis thanked them for their service and said,

The various Authorities and other personalities who visit the See of Peter experience their first contact with this House and receive their first impressions through you, dear Gentlemen. As your name indicates, the gifts of politeness and cordiality are therefore necessary to put these people at ease."

They also acted as pallbearers during the funeral for Pope Benedict XVI, carrying the body into St. Peter's Basilica. They acted in the same fashion to bring the body of Pope Francis from Domus Sanctae Marthae to St. Peter's Basilica, from the basilica to the square for his funeral, and into Saint Mary Major Basilica for his internment.

== See also ==
- Index of Vatican City-related articles
