= Critical Mass (Canadian band) =

Canadian Christian rock band

- Origin: Kitchener-Waterloo, Ontario, Canada
- Genres: Christian rock
- Years active: 1996–present
- Labels: Independent
- Website: criticalmassmusic.org

Critical Mass is a Canadian Christian rock music group from Waterloo Region. The band is heavily influenced by its Catholic roots. They have produced and released seven albums. Their songs have appeared on albums that have sold more than 60,000 copies, making this band one of Canada's most successful independent artists.

== Meaning of the name ==
The name has a double meaning. It is both a reference to the Liturgy and a reference to critical mass in the physical sense. "Critical mass" is symbolically a reference to there being enough young people enthusiastic about their Catholic faith to cause a spiritual explosion.

== History of the band ==
Critical Mass was formed in 1997 by a group of friends, David Wang, Eric Kubica, Matt Devine, Tim Devine and Tom Pawelkos, who wanted to introduce Catholic youth to contemporary Christian music. Initially the group focused on leading worship at youth events and Masses. The original group members were Matt and Tim Devine, Eric Kubica, Tom and Sharon Pawelko, Matthew Bierschbach, Lorraine Adams, and David and Jodie Wang. The band wrote original music influenced by their Catholic faith. Their first album was a demo recording, Faith Looks Up and received positive reviews. The album went on to win the band Best International Group and Best Modern Rock/Alternative album from the United Catholic Music and Video Association. One of the songs, "I'll Be Fine" topped the spiritual rock charts at mp3.com. Lorraine Adams left the band in 1999.

Their second album Completely was produced by Andrew Horrocks and had a more professional sound than the debut demo release. The album immediately garnered the Best Album of the Year at the Canadian Gospel Music Association's Covenant Awards. The song "Humility" was finalist for Rock Song of the Year as well. The Canadian Gospel Music Association and their Covenant Awards are the equivalent of the prestigious Dove Awards in the United States.

The success of Completely resulted in the group being invited to be one of the major two bands involved in the larger liturgical celebrations at World Youth Day 2002 in Toronto. The band was given the honor of performing at both the Papal Welcoming Ceremony and at the Papal Vigil, the latter of which was seen by the 600,000 in attendance and on international television. Except for David Wang, the members of the band then left to pursue other projects. Tim Devine has since entered the priesthood with the Companions of the Cross.

David Wang and new band members Scott McKendrick, Luke Kupczyk, Tracey Doyle, Paul Kieffer, Lawrence Lam and assisted by Harvey Armoogan continued the mission of Critical Mass with the album Grasping for Hope in the Darkness which was released on September 11, 2004. It too, won Best Rock Album honours at the Covenant Awards. Their cover of the Kansas classic, "Carry On Wayward Son" also was nominated for Best Rock Song. Over the next two years, Critical Mass extended its reach into the United States with touring and retreats.

In October 2006, the band again received International Group of the Year honours from the United Catholic Music and Video Association. About the same time the band was joined by new member Dave Flitton.

In 2007, Critical Mass released a live praise and worship effort called Celebrate, which includes covers of popular worship songs as well as some remakes of songs from the album Completely. This album was nominated for 6 United Catholic Music and Video Association Awards.

In 2009, Critical Mass released Body Language, an album based on Pope John Paul II's Theology of the Body. This is one of the first Christian rock albums to ever deal so explicitly with the topics of sex, love and communion, in a Catholic Christian context.

Critical Mass marked 2012 with the release of 15 (1997-2012), a compilation album with three new songs along with 12 other songs from their catalog.

In 2021, Critical Mass ended a 9 year absence from the music scene with the release of Serenity, a concept album that followed lead singer David Wang's journey from separation, divorce, mental health, parental alienation to faith, hope and love. Then, on Remembrance Day 2023, Critical Mass released their first holiday release entitled Christmas is Real, featuring four new Christmas compositions.

In addition to performing, co-founder David Wang influences the direction of the contemporary Catholic music scene as a music columnist for the Catholic Register, a position he has held since 1995. Critical Mass has had a part to play in a recent return by the youth to more traditional Catholicism

When asked if they would ever consider signing with a major record label they stated that they "are an independent band and very proud of it".

== Members ==
- Dave Wang - vocals
- April Philpotts - keyboard
- Luke Kupczyk - guitar
- Scott McKendrick - bass
- Dave Flitton - keyboard, guitar
- Kevin Dupuis - guitar
- Adam Dupuis - drums
- Paul Kieffer - drums (past)
- Tracey Doyle - percussion (past)
- Lawrence Lam - keyboard (past)

== Television appearances ==
Critical Mass has been featured in two 1 hour music specials on Salt + Light Television and has been featured on the CBC and Vision TV, among others.

== Discography ==
=== Albums ===
- Faith Looks Up (1997, Producer Ron Roy)
- Broken Records Sampler (1998, Critical Mass contributed one song, "Wisdom")
- Completely (2000, Producer Andrew Horrocks)
- Light of the World/Lumiere du Monde (2002, Official CD of World Youth Day 2002, Critical Mass contributed the song "Share it with the World")
- Grasping For Hope in the Darkness (2004, Producer Andrew Horrocks)
- Celebrate (2006, Producer Andrew Horrocks)
- Gift of God (2007, a compilation CD for the Eucharistic Congress in 2008, Critical Mass contributed 2 songs to this compilation: "Reverend Larebil" and "Body and Blood", while David Wang was the executive producer for the CD)
- Catholic Music 2007 (2007, a very successful collection by SpiritWing Records. Critical Mass contributed the song "Dorian Gray")
- Catholic Music 2008 ( Critical Mass contributed the song "Body and Blood")
- Rocking Romans- Best of new Catholic Music 2008 (Critical Mass contributed the song "Body and Blood")
- Body Language (2009, Producer Andrew Horrocks)
- 15 (1997-2012) (2012, Producer Andrew Horrocks)
- Serenity (2021, Producer Andrew Horrocks)
- Christmas is Real (2023, Producer Andrew Horrocks)

=== Music videos ===
- I'll Be Fine, 1998, directed by Ray Lyell
- Body and Blood, 1998, directed by Ray Lyell
- Kephas, 1997, directed by Ray Lyell
- Mary's Song, 2003, produced by Salt and Light Television (notable for featuring scenes from Mel Gibson's The Passion of the Christ and, for copyright reasons, has never been made publicly available except for Salt and Light Television)
- Set Me Free, 2003, directed by David Wang, promotional video only
- Your Mysterious Ways, 2005, directed by David Wang, promotional video only
- Dorian Gray, 2005, concept by David Wang, live footage from Salt and Light Television
- War, 2013, concept and editing by David Wang
- O Canada, 2017, filmed and directed by David Wang, nominated for Canadian Gospel Music Association Best Video Award 2017
- Be Not Afraid by Catholic Artists from Home, 200520, participation of David Wang
- Misery My Friend, 2020, created and directed by David Wang
- Serenity, 2021, created and directed by David Wang
- Leaving Town, 2021, directed by David Wang, Official selection: Fillum International Storical & Short Film Festival, First Time Filmmaker Sessions, Lift-Off Sessions, Finalist: Sweden Film Awards
- AlieNation, 2021, directed by David Wang

=== Songs on compilations ===
- Gift Of God: Célébrons, "Reverend Larebil", "Body And Blood (Adoremus Version)" (2007)

== Awards ==
=== GMA Canada Covenant Awards ===
- 2000 Rock Album Of The Year: Completely
- 2005 Rock Album Of The Year: Grasping For Hope In The Darkness

=== GMA Canada Covenant Award Nominations ===
- 1997 Rock Album of the Year: Faith Looks Up
- 2000 Rock Song of the Year: Humility
- 2005 Rock Song of the Year: Carry On Wayward Son
- 2007 Special Events Album of the Year Gift of God
- 2012 Special Events Album of the Year 15 (1997-2012)
- 2017 Music Video of the Year O Canada

=== United Catholic Music and Video Association Unity Awards ===
- 2000 International Group of the year
- 2000 Modern Rock/ Alternative Album of the Year: Faith Looks Up
- 2006 International Group of the year

=== Rocking Romans International Catholic Music Competition ===
- 2007 Band of the Year
