= Chris Skinner (statistician) =

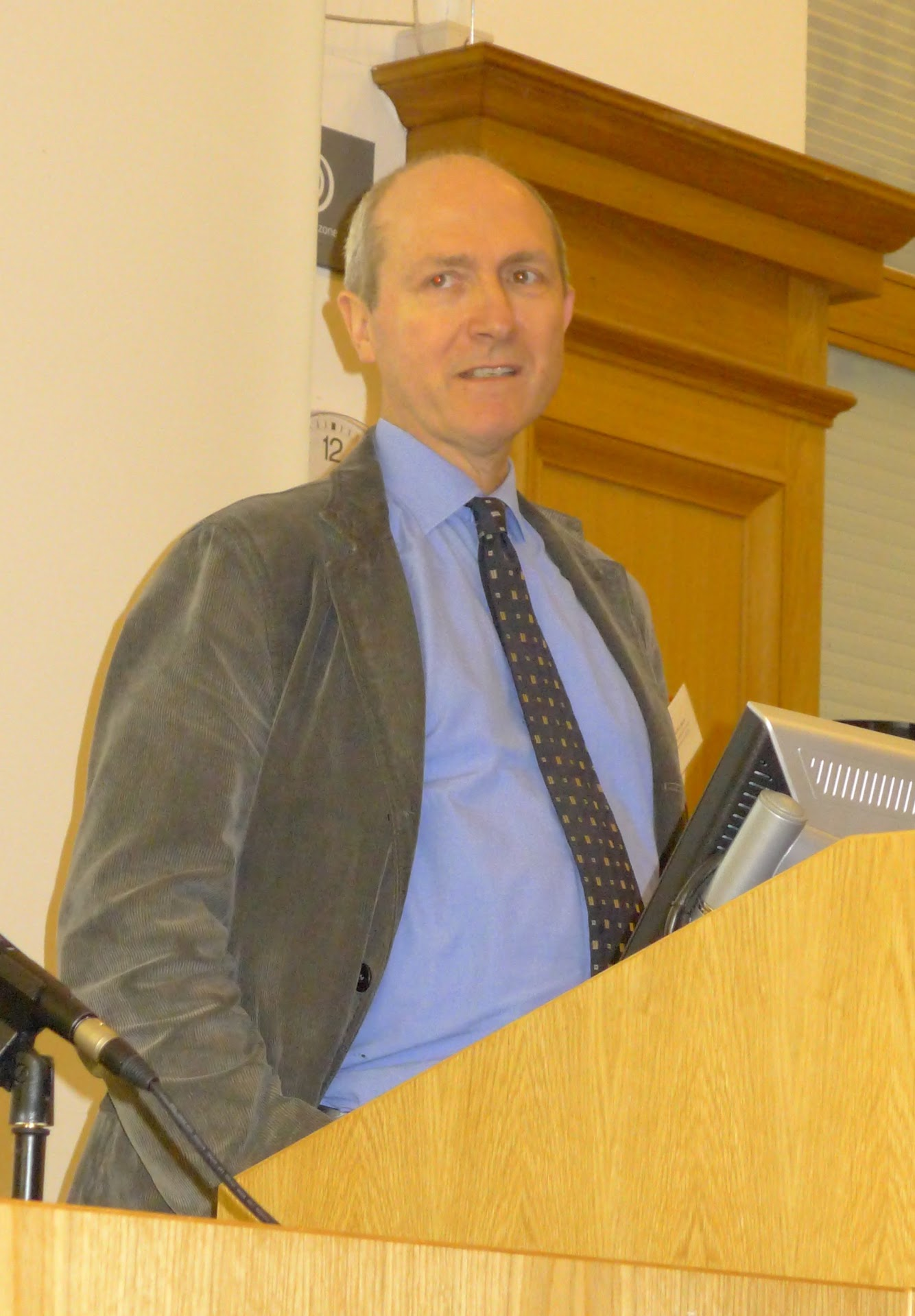
- Born: Christopher John Skinner; 12 March 1953; Penge, South London, England
- Died: 21 February 2020 (aged 66)
- Education: University of Cambridge (BA); London School of Economics (MSc); University of Southampton (PhD)
- Known for: Survey methodology Statistical disclosure control
- Awards: CBE (2010); West Medal (2009); Waksberg Award (2019)
- Scientific career
- Fields: Statistics, social sciences
- Workplaces: University of Southampton; London School of Economics

Christopher John Skinner CBE FBA FAcSS (12 March 1953 – 21 February 2020) was a British statistician and an expert in the statistical aspects of survey methodology. Over his career, he made significant contributions to social statistics, particularly in the areas of sample surveys, statistical disclosure control, and research methodology across the social sciences. He was a Professor of Statistics at the London School of Economics (LSE) and the University of Southampton.

== Early life and education ==
Chris Skinner was born in Penge, South London, on 12 March 1953 to Richard and Daphne Skinner. He attended St Dunstan's College in Catford, where he demonstrated an early aptitude for mathematics under an innovative curriculum that introduced computing, statistics, and logic.

He went on to study at the University of Cambridge, completing a Bachelor of Arts in Mathematics in 1975. Taking an interest in the philosophical elements of statistics, he proceeded to the London School of Economics and earned an MSc in Statistics with distinction in 1976. In 1982, he completed his PhD in Social Statistics at the University of Southampton.

== Career ==
Following his master's degree, Skinner briefly worked as an assistant statistician at the Central Statistical Office before returning to the LSE as a research assistant (1977–1978). In 1978, he joined the University of Southampton as a lecturer. He spent 33 years at Southampton, eventually becoming a Senior Lecturer in 1989, Professor of Statistics in 1994, and the Leverhulme Professor of Social Statistics.

During his time at Southampton, Skinner served as Head of the Department of Social Statistics (1997–2000) and was a major driving force in creating an influential MSc programme in Official Statistics in 1999, bridging the gap between academia and national statistical institutes. He was also instrumental in building the Social Statistics Research Centre and served as the founding Director of the Economic and Social Research Council's (ESRC) National Centre for Research Methods. On a European level, he led the European Science Foundation's first programme in Quantitative Methods in the Social Sciences.

In 2011, Skinner returned to the London School of Economics as a Professor of Statistics, where he served as Head of the Department from 2013 to 2016.

== Research and contributions ==
Skinner was globally recognized for his work on survey sampling. His primary research focused on:

- Developing methods for sampling design, estimation, and analysis.
- Handling missing data and measurement error in complex surveys.
- Combining survey data with alternative data sources.
- Statistical disclosure control: Skinner did pioneering work on data privacy and protection, establishing methodologies that allow public data release while safeguarding individual anonymity.

In addition to academic research, he provided extensive methodological guidance to government bodies. He served on the Statistical Methods Advisory Committee at Statistics Canada (2000–2011) and the Methodology Advisory Committee of the UK Government Statistical Service (2001–2010). He also led an independent review of the methodological work of the Office for National Statistics in preparation for the 2021 UK census.

== Honors and awards ==
Skinner received widespread recognition for his contributions to the social sciences and survey methodology:

- Fellow of the British Academy (FBA) – Elected in 2004.
- Fellow of the American Statistical Association
- Fellow of the Academy of Social Sciences (FAcSS)
- West Medal (2009) – Awarded by the Royal Statistical Society for his contributions to social statistics.
- Commander of the Order of the British Empire (CBE) (2010) – Awarded in the Queen's Birthday Honours for services to social science.
- Waksberg Award (2019) – Recognizing outstanding contributions to survey methodology.

== Selected bibliography ==
Skinner authored over 80 peer-reviewed articles and co-edited several highly influential books that are considered foundational texts in the analysis of survey data. Some of his most cited works include:

=== Books ===
- Skinner, C. J.; Holt, D.; Smith, T. M. F. (1989). Analysis of Complex Surveys. John Wiley & Sons. ISBN 978-0471923770.
- Chambers, R. L.; Skinner, C. J. (2003). Analysis of Survey Data. John Wiley & Sons. ISBN 978-0471899877.

=== Most cited papers ===
- Skinner, C. J.; Elliot, M. J. (2002). "A measure of disclosure risk for microdata". Journal of the Royal Statistical Society, Series B (Statistical Methodology). 64 (4): 855–867. doi:10.1111/1467-9868.00365.
- Skinner, C.; Wakefield, J. (2017). "Introduction to the Design and Analysis of Complex Survey Data". Statistical Science. 32 (2): 165–175. doi:10.1214/17-sts614.
- Shlomo, N.; Skinner, C. J. (2022). "Measuring Risk of Re-Identification in Microdata: State-of-the Art and New Directions". Journal of the Royal Statistical Society, Series A (Statistics in Society). 185 (4): 1644–1662. doi:10.1111/rssa.12902.

== Personal life ==
Skinner was married to his wife, Sandra. He has two sons, Tom and Sam, from his previous marriage. He died on 21 February 2020 at the age of 66.
