= Beatrice Leung =

Hong Kong Catholic nun and geopolitics professor

Sister Beatrice Leung (Chinese: 梁潔芬) is a member of the Catholic order of the Sisters of the Precious Blood of Hong Kong, and is a professor at Wenzao Ursuline University of Languages. She is an expert on the history of Catholic Church in China.

== Career ==
Leung is a member of the Catholic order of the Sisters of the Precious Blood of Hong Kong, and is a professor at Wenzao Ursuline University of Languages. She has previously held posts as a lecturer in Social Sciences at Lingnan University, and at the University of Macau. She studied for her PhD at the London School of Economics. She is widely regarded as an expert on the Catholic Church in China.

On the subject of the 2018 proposals that the Vatican and the Catholic Church in China could come to an arrangement over the ordination and approval of bishops, Leung said that she felt that the "Vatican lacked expertise when it came to dealing with China’s government and risked getting “trapped.” She had previously coined the phrase "conflicting authority" to reflect the relationship between the organisations. She has also been outspoken about the role of the Catholic church in Hong Kong as an enabler of colonialism.

== Reception ==
Historian Ka-Che Yip described Sino-Vatican Relations as "an excellent study [on a] relatively unexplored topic" and "an important contribution to our understanding of ... issues of church and state in China". Sociologist William T Liu described her analysis of the role of the church in Hong Kong on the return of the region to China, as "refreshing" with a particular emphasis on how the church may evolve under Communist rule.

== Selected works ==
=== Books ===
- Beatrice K. F. Leung & Shun-hing Chan, Changing Church and State Relations in Hong Kong, 1950–2000 (Hong Kong University Press, 2003).
- Beatrice K. F. Leung, Sino-Vatican Relations (Cambridge University Press, 1992).

=== Articles ===
- Leung B.K.F. (2022) Evangelization Through Education, from Simple Schooling to Universities in China. In: Chu C.Y., Leung B. (eds) The Palgrave Handbook of the Catholic Church in East Asia. Palgrave Macmillan, Singapore.
- Leung, Beatrice. "China's religious freedom policy: The art of managing religious activity." The China Quarterly 184 (2005): 894-913.
- Leung, Beatrice. “The Sino-Vatican Negotiations: Old Problems in a New Context.” The China Quarterly, vol. 153, 1998, pp. 128–140.
- Beatrice K. F. Leung & Stuart S. Nagel (1993) Super-optimizing china: reunification as an example, International Journal of Public Administration, 16:9, 1459-1481.
