= Chris Skinner (singer) =

Christopher Lawrence Skinner SM
- Also known as: Chris Skinner
- Born: 13 December 1958 (age 67); Hamilton, New Zealand
- Genres: CCM; Pop; Easy listening
- Occupations: Marist priest, singer-songwriter
- Years active: 1990–present

Christopher Lawrence Skinner, SM (born 13 December 1958 in Hamilton, New Zealand) is a New Zealand Catholic priest and singer-songwriter. A member of the Marist Order, Skinner is best known nationally for his musical career as a recording artist of Christian Contemporary music. Since 1990 Skinner has released over twenty albums of largely original music with songs influenced by his faith and commitment to social justice, as well as covering the songs of other artists. He has cited his own life experiences and those of others as informing the thematic and lyrical content of his songwriting.

== Early life ==
Taking an interest in music from a young age, Skinner began writing songs when he was 16 years old. At age 19, his devotion to Catholicism and familial ties to the Church led him to enter religious life, culminating in his ordination as a priest in the Society of Mary. Skinner nevertheless retained his passion for music alongside his spiritual vocation and at age 30 began writing what became his first studio album, Under Southern Stars, recorded in Australia with the encouragement of a personal friend.

In a 2013 profile published in the New Zealand edition of The Australian Women's Weekly, Skinner recalled how the Church held "initial misgivings" regarding his forays into the music world, with concerns as to whether he was "taking the priesthood seriously". As his career as a "religious crooner" progressed, however, the Society of Mary began embracing his musical ministry as a form of spiritual outreach. During religious services Skinner is known to incorporate interludes where he performs a song from his catalogue to support a sermon.

== Musical career ==
Skinner has been described as New Zealand's "high priest of heavenly pop" and a "pop star priest". In 2004, New Zealand entertainer and promoter Gray Bartlett highlighted Skinner as a "world quality" performer of inspirational music, praising his distinct "pop-folk" style and comparing the Marist priest's rendition of Secret Garden's "You Raise Me Up" favorably to that of American singer-songwriter Josh Groban.

His songs have aired regularly in the rotation of Christian radio stations in New Zealand, particularly the Rhema Media network, which has featured his work as an exemplar of "home grown" Christian Contemporary musicianship. Skinner was voted Artist of the Year on Southern Star Radio for 2007, and the following year the same station named his cover of "You Raise Me Up" its Song of the Year.

In February 2013 Skinner performed at the Mission Estate Winery Concert in Hawke's Bay as one of the opening acts for headliners Barry Gibb and Carole King.

Later in 2013 Skinner teamed up with fellow New Zealand vocalist Janice Bateman to record Reason to Believe. This album of duets went on to achieve mainstream success, peaking at number 5 on the Official Top 20 charts of New Zealand recording artists in May 2014. At this apex Reason to Believe was positioned directly behind Lorde's debut studio album Pure Heroine.

Skinner has also found recognition outside of the Catholic community and religious radio with the song "Sons of Gallipoli", his ode to the soldiers of ANZAC. In November 2014, then Governor General of New Zealand Sir Jerry Mateparae invited Skinner to sing "Sons of Gallipoli" to a gathering of veterans at an Armistice Day dinner at Government House, Wellington. Sir Jerry's invitation resulted from having heard the priest perform the song at the National RSA Conference earlier that year.

== Discography ==
=== Albums ===
- Under Southern Stars (1990)
- There Is No Distance (1992)
- Chants For Silence (1994)
- Movement of Time (1996)
- You Make Me Feel This Way (1998)
- Awesome God (1999)
- Overcome By Love (2000)
- Serenity (2003)
- Chris Skinner – A Collection of His Songs 1990–1996 (2003)
- Golden Light (2005)
- You Raise Me Up (2005)
- You Are The Gift – The Christmas Album (2006)
- Truly Blessed (2007)
- A Place at the Table (2008)
- Like A Beautiful Day (2010)
- Pilgrims of the Heart (2011)
- Reason To Believe (with Janice Bateman) (2013)
- A Noble Work (2014)
- Angel of the Forest (2015)
- Holy Land (2017)
- Making Music To Your Name (2018)
- Light in the Lockdown (2020)
