= Narsaq =

Town in Greenland

Narsaq Nordprøven
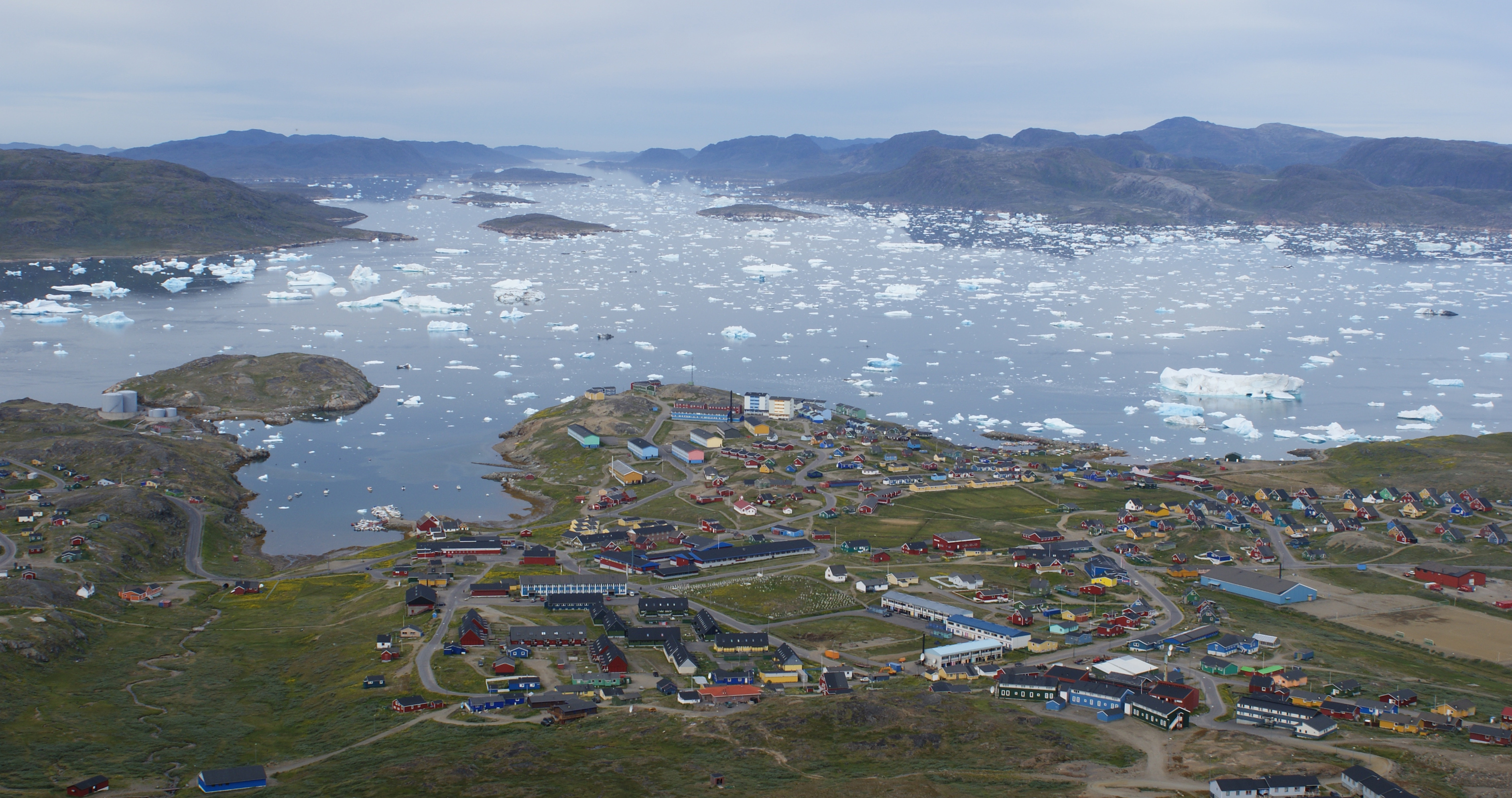
- Narsaq skyline from Qaqqarsuaq mountain

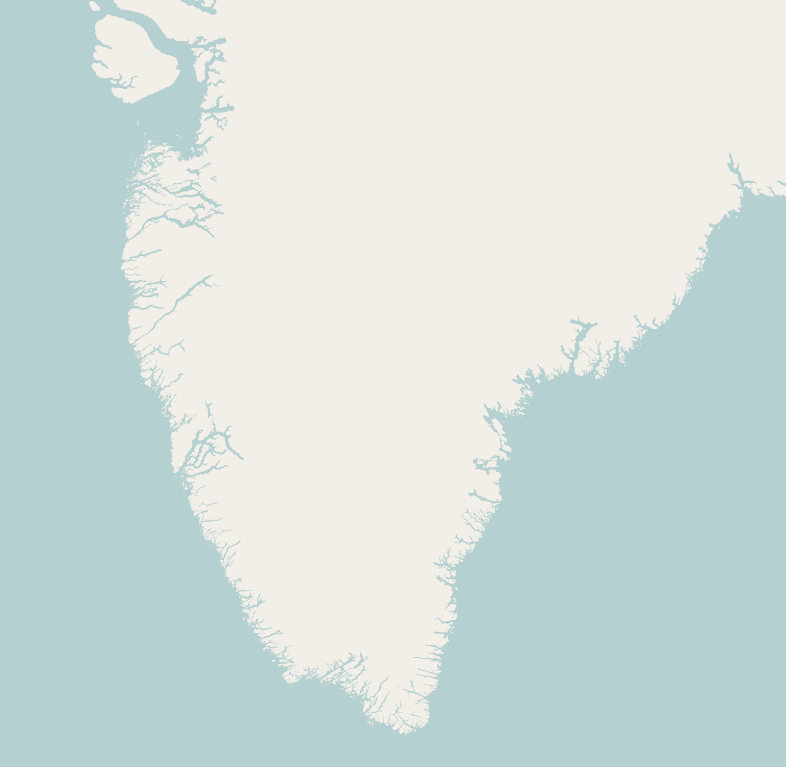
- Location within southern Greenland
- Coordinates: 60°54′44″N 46°02′55″W
- State: Kingdom of Denmark
- Constituent country: Greenland
- Municipality: Kujalleq
- Founded: 1830

Population (2025)
  - Total: 1,242
- Time zone: UTC−02:00 (Western Greenland Time)
  - Summer (DST): UTC−01:00 (Western Greenland Summer Time)
- Postal code: 3921
- Website: narsaq.gl

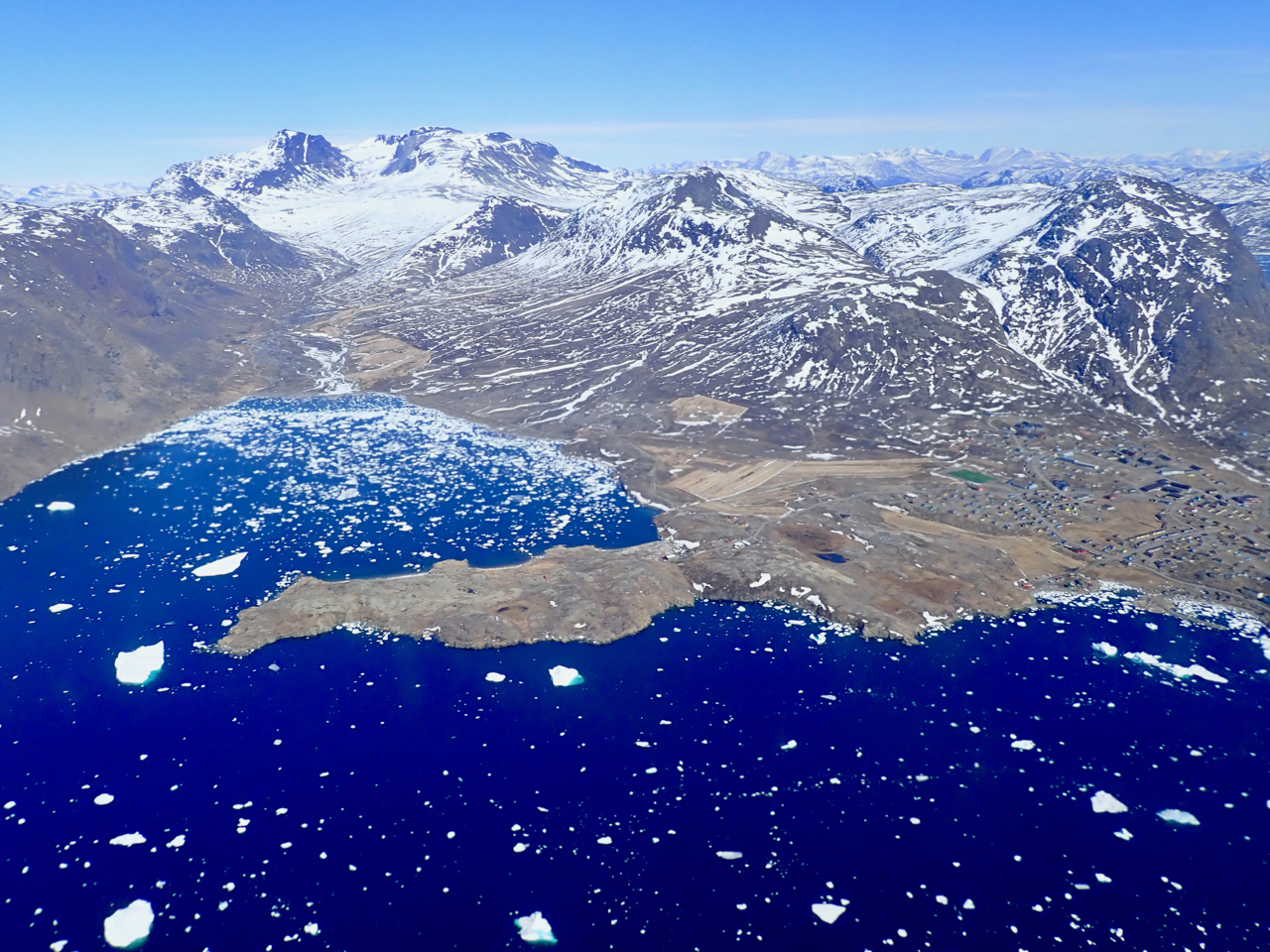
Aerial view of Narsaq and Narsaq Sound, April 2018

Narsaq (Note: Pre-1973 orthography: Narssaĸ) (Greenlandic, lit. 'Plain' or 'Field'; Danish), formerly Nordprøven (Danish, lit. 'The North Test' or 'The North Trial'), is a town in Kujalleq, Greenland, Kingdom of Denmark on the shores of Tunulliarfik Fjord.

== History ==
People have lived in the area for thousands of years, but not continuously. Remains of the Norse settlement can be found in the area. The church ruins of Dyrnæs can be found on the north-western outskirts of the town. The Landnám homestead, Landnamsgaarden, can be found immediately to the west of the town. Dated to the year 1000, the homestead is among the oldest of the Norse ruins in the area. Excavation of the ruins began in 1953 with the discovery of the Narsaq stick, the first Viking Age runic inscription discovered in Greenland. The wider Narsaq area has some of the most striking Norse artifacts and ruins. Erik the Red's Brattahlid is located in present-day Qassiarsuk, and the Gardar bishop seat is in present-day Igaliku.

Present day Narsaq was founded as Nordprøven ("North Prøven") in 1830, distinguishing it from Sydprøven ("South Prøven", modern Alluitsup Paa) established the same year. The initial settlement was founded as a trading colony of Qaqortoq, then named Julianehaab.

A trading center was established here due to the natural deep water harbor which could accommodate ocean faring vessels. Initially local seal hunters traded blubber and seal skin for continental goods, such as coffee, sugar, bread and buckwheat.

Until approximately 1900 seal hunting formed the main economy for Narsaq. In the early 1900s seal hunting began to fail, and the main basis for the economy gradually shifted to fishing. The city's historical fishing village is from 1914. The main house of the historical village today houses the power company in the city.

Simiutak at the Skovfjord mouth near Narsaq was a HF/DF radio range finding station called Bluie West Three during World War II. The station commenced operations in January 1942, and was permanently staffed until the end of the war.

The population also increased during this period, from 25 in 1870, to 162 in 1919, and to 300 in 1930. However the settlement did not experience significant population growth until 1953, when its first prawn and fishing factory of Royal Greenland was established. The factory was subsequently closed in 2010.

In 1959 the population exceeded 600, and Narsaq achieved town status. With 1,346 inhabitants as of 2020, it is the ninth-largest town in Greenland. Several hundred people live in the surrounding community.

The town is notable for the 1990 Narsaq massacre, a mass shooting where seven people were killed and one was wounded. The shooting was the worst in Greenland's history.

Until 31 December 2008, the town was the administrative center of Narsaq Municipality in the Kitaa amt. In addition to the town, the municipality consisted of the Qassiarsuk, Igaliku and Narsarsuaq settlements, as well as several sheep and reindeer farms. On 1 January 2009, Narsaq became part of Kujalleq municipality, when the county of Kitaa, as well as the municipalities of Narsaq, Qaqortoq, and Nanortalik ceased to exist as administrative entities.

== Economy ==
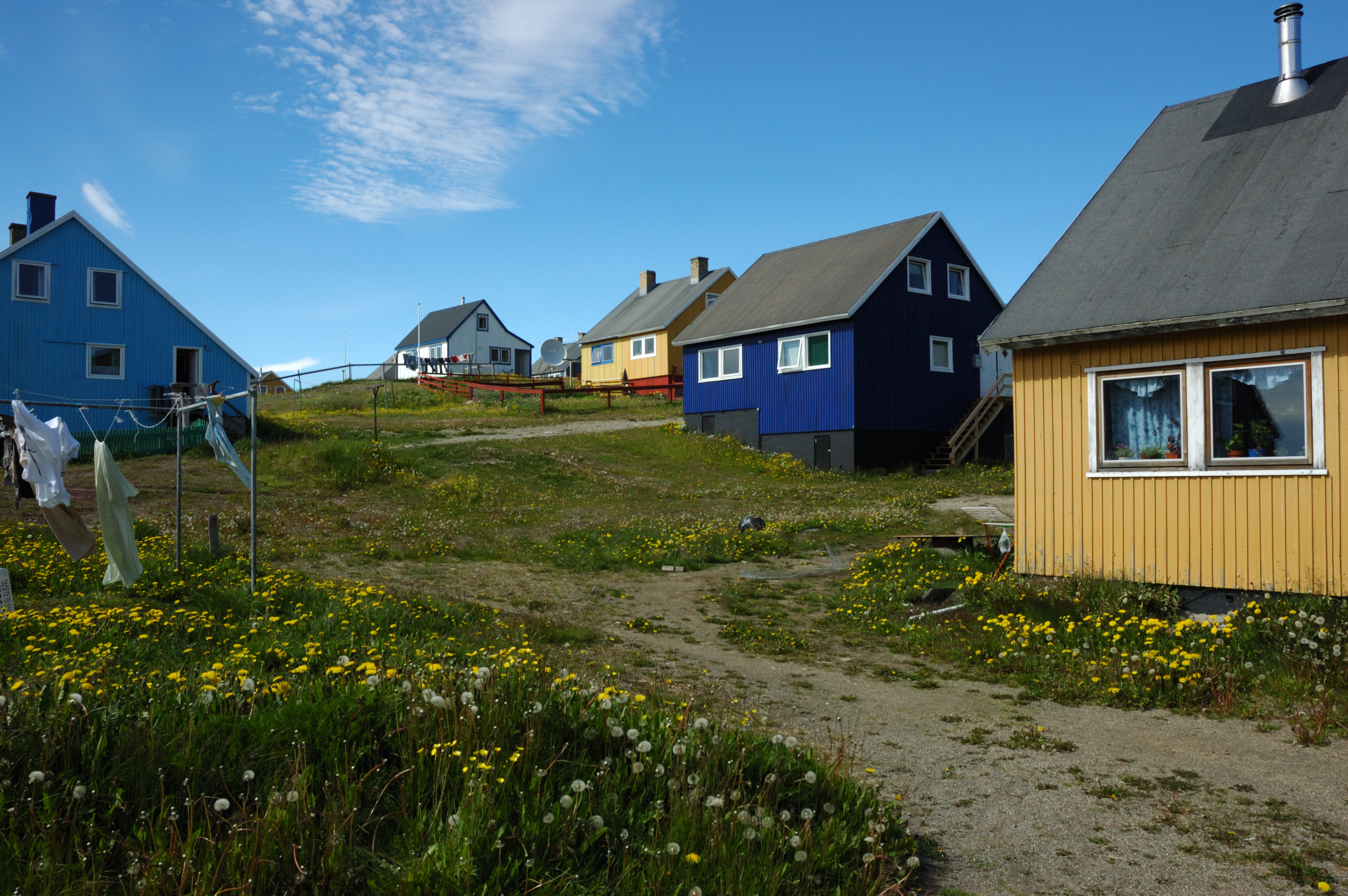
Colorful houses of Narsaq

=== Fishing ===
Fishing is the mainstay of the local economy. Local fjords are full of marine life, including whales, salmon, and seals.

=== Sheep farming ===
Farming is possible on the plains to the north of the town, with several actively maintained arable fields. Of the 53 registered sheep farms in Greenland, 31 are located in the Narsaq area. The farms produce meat for domestic consumption, and the Narsaq slaughterhouse Neqi A/S, a wholly owned subsidiary of KNI, is the only slaughterhouse in the country. The sheep farming area of Tasiusaq is located in former Norse area.

=== Tourism ===
The third major part of the economy is tourism. South Greenland has experienced a decline in tourist revenue in recent years, but tourism still supports a significant percentage of the viable workforce. Popular activities include hiking, fishing, collecting rare minerals and taking boat trips to the ice cap.

== Services and infrastructure ==
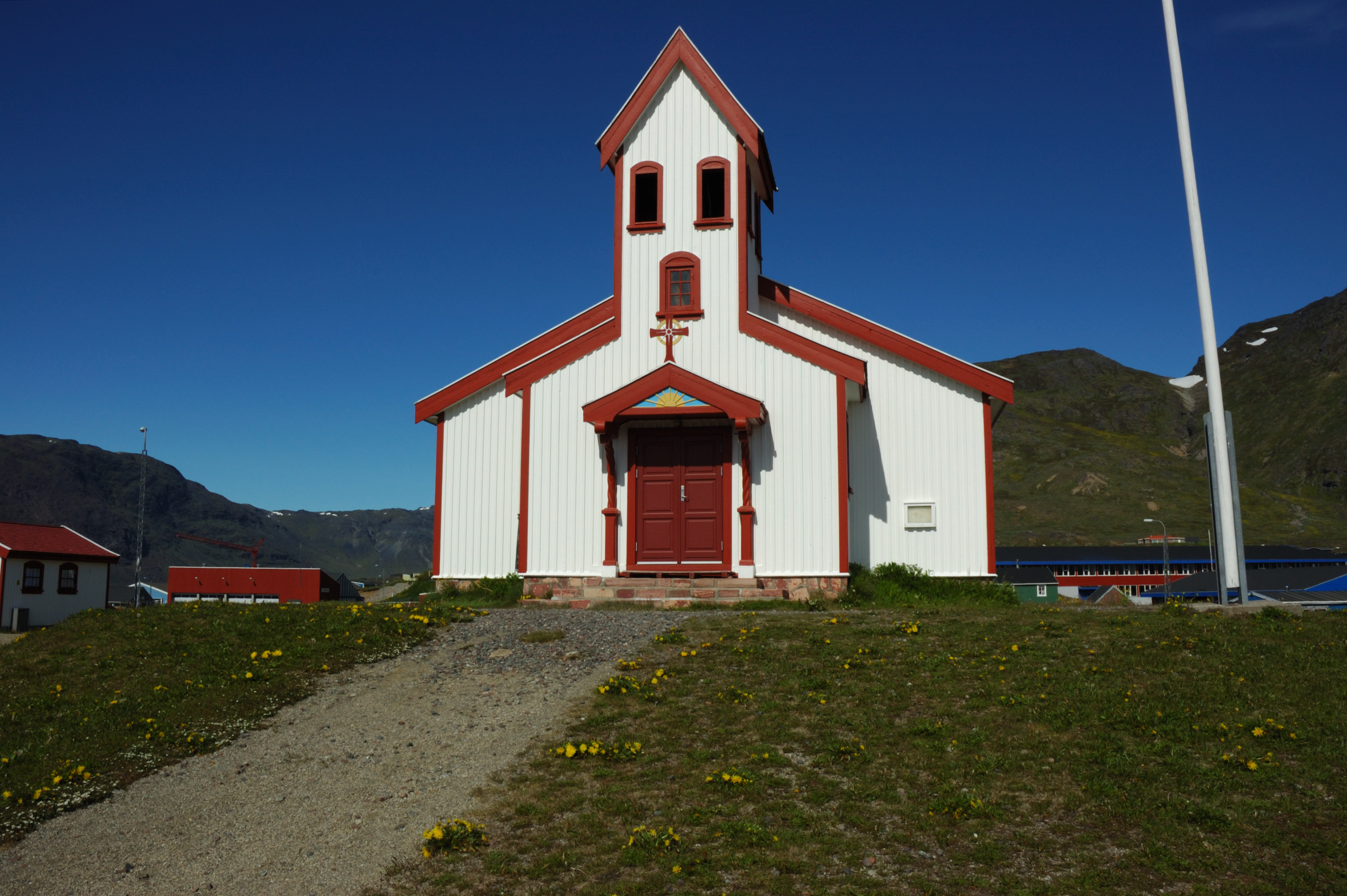
Church in Narsaq

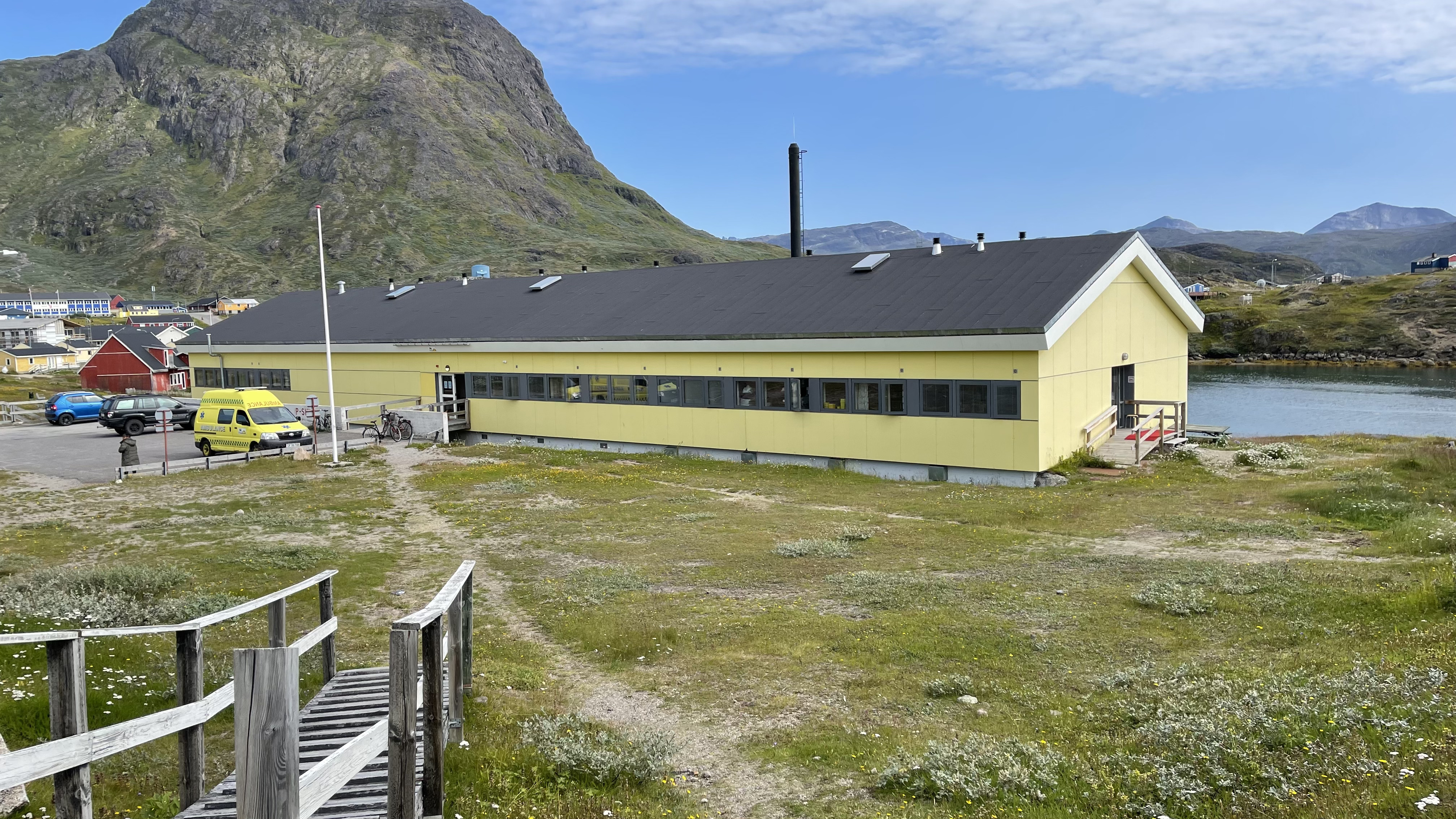
Narsaq Hospital

Today Narsaq has a town hall, two supermarkets, a church, a police station, a firestation, a primary school, several educational facilities, an internet café, a hospital, a museum, and several small shops. Greenland's first brewery, Greenland Brewhouse, was established in Narsaq in 2004.

The town hospital is housed in a two-storey building and has 14 beds. The town health services also include a dental clinic.

Narsaq Church was designed by local carpenter Pavia Høegh in 1927. The church was refurbished and expanded in 1981.

The only Food Science College in the country is located in Narsaq. The school, INUILI, is the main education center for chefs in Greenland, and it has a staff of 20.

Electricity in the town is provided by the government-owned company Nukissiorfiit. Since 2007, Narsaq gets its electricity from the 7.2 MW Qorlortorsuaq Dam by way of a 70-kilometer (43 mi) 70 kV transmission line, also connecting Qaqortoq. Narsaq is also connected by fibre-optic cable to Qaqortoq (which is connected onwards by the Greenland Connect submarine cable) via the same transmission line.

== Transport ==
=== Air ===
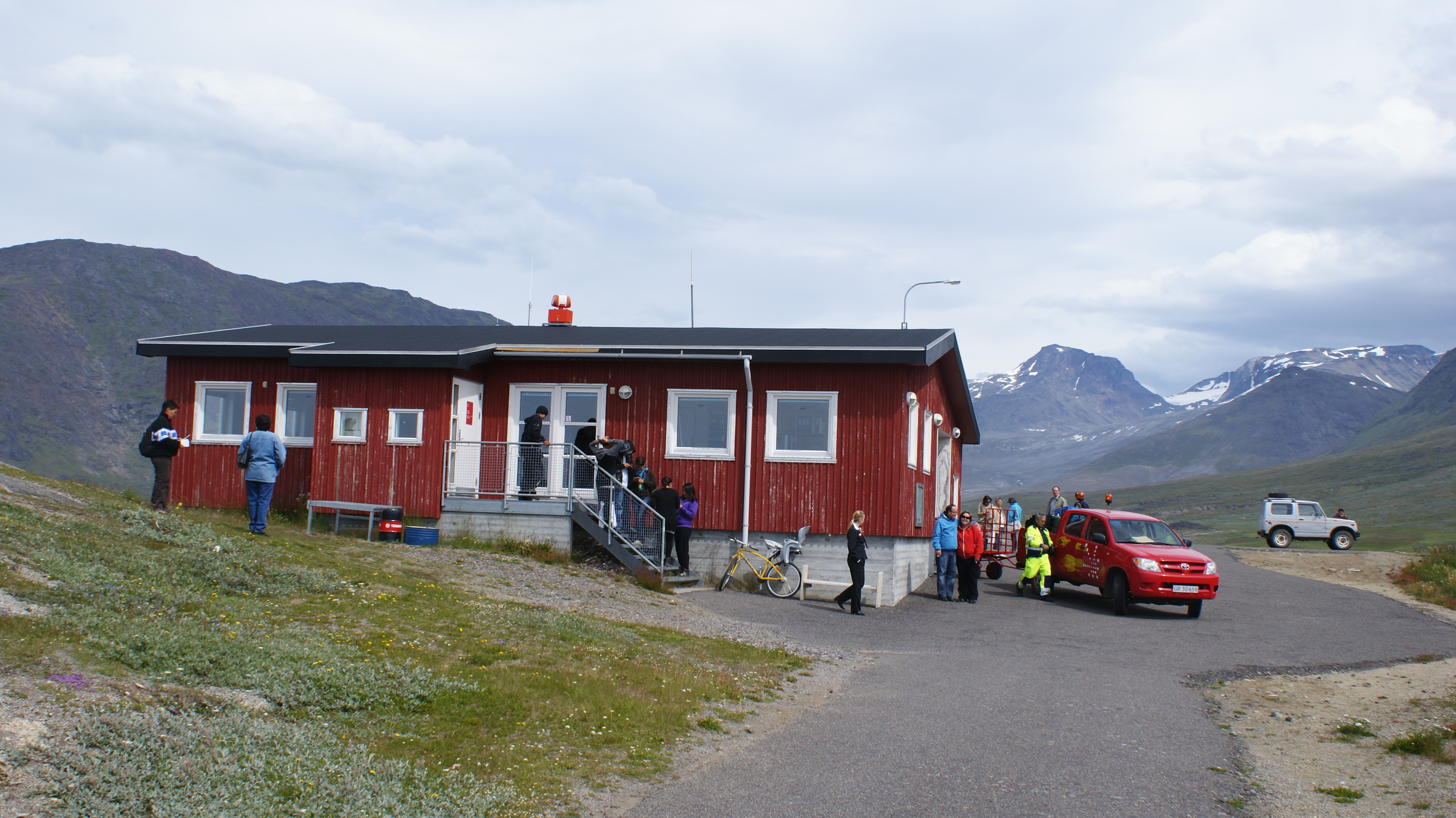
Air Greenland provides air connections to Qaqortoq and Narsarsuaq

Narsaq Heliport operates year-round, linking Narsaq with Qaqortoq and the large Narsarsuaq Airport, which offers onward connections with the rest of Greenland and Europe.

=== Sea ===
The harbor of Narsaq is a natural coastal harbor with steep depth. Narsaq is a port of call for the Arctic Umiaq Line coastal ship in the summer season. The port can accommodate deep seagoing vessels due to the steep depth of the shore. The port authority for Narsaq is Royal Arctic Line, located in Nuuk. Port pilotage is available upon request, and is recommended.

=== Land ===
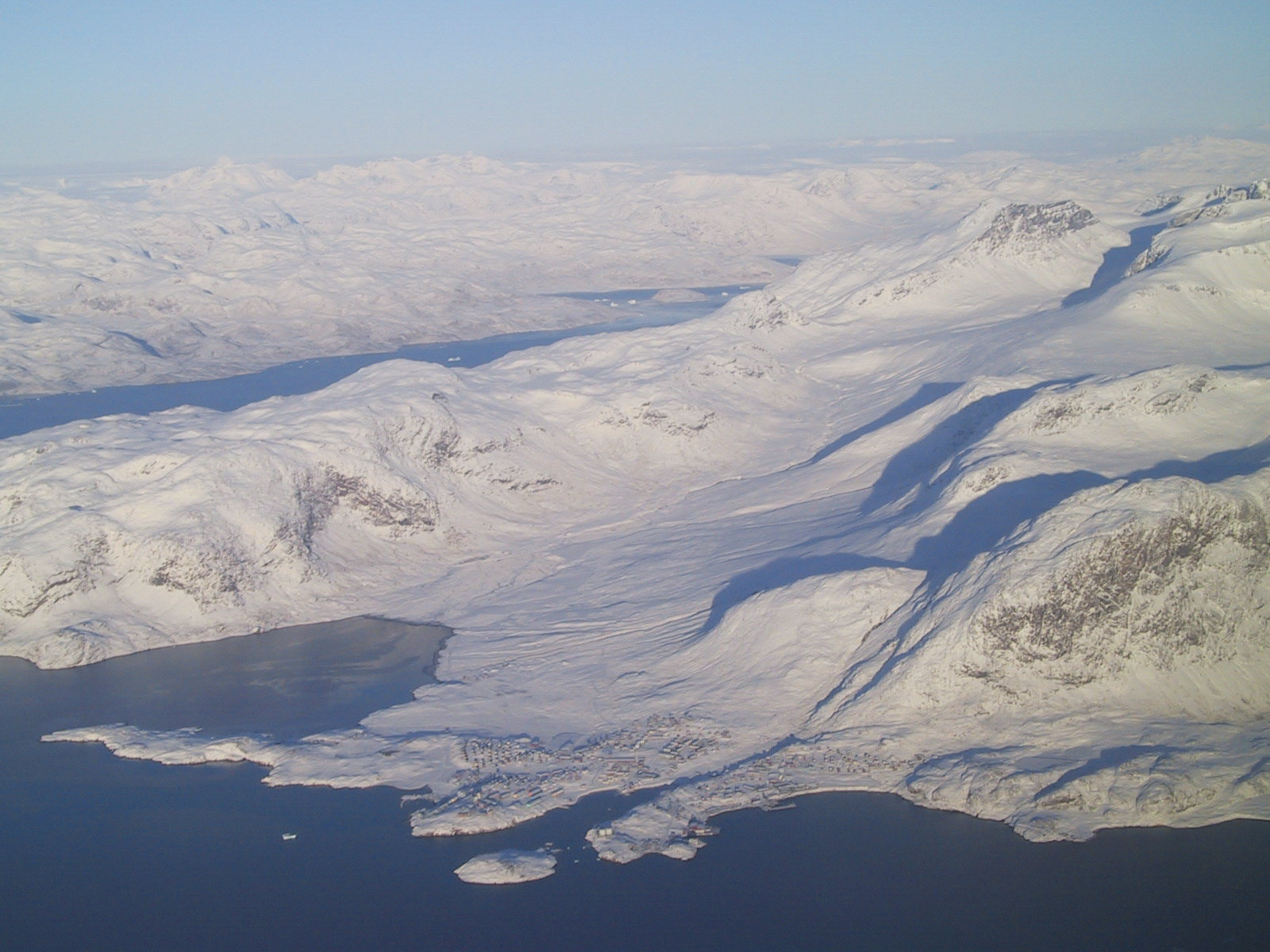
Narsaq in January

There is a road leading into the valley a few kilometres towards the former mine at Kvanefjeld. In the area around Qassiarsuk, further inland from Narsaq, a very simple road network suitable for all-terrain vehicles, totalling around 80 km (50 mi) exists connecting a handful of sheep farms. Narsaq is not connected to this road network, but some investigations have proposed a 40 km extension. Separately, a road and ferry connection from Narsaq to Qaqortoq has been proposed, with a tunnel being another option. During winter dog sled routes are important transport links to the surrounding area.

== Population ==
With 1,346 inhabitants as of 2020, Narsaq is the second-largest town in the Kujalleq municipality. The population has decreased 25% relative to the 1990 levels, and has been decreasing over the last several years. Most towns and settlements in southern Greenland exhibit negative growth patterns over the last two decades, with many settlements rapidly depopulating.

== Climate ==
Narsaq experiences a wet tundra climate (Köppen: ET) moderated by the Gulf Stream; with quite cool summers and long, very cold winters.

Climate data for Narsaq Heliport (60.92°N 46.05°W) (19 m (62 ft) AMSL) (1991-2021 data)
Month	Jan	Feb	Mar	Apr	May	Jun	Jul	Aug	Sep	Oct	Nov	Dec	Year
Record high °C (°F)	14.0 (57.2)	14.7 (58.5)	13.2 (55.8)	16.2 (61.2)	24.3 (75.7)	20.6 (69.1)	23.4 (74.1)	21.7 (71.1)	22.1 (71.8)	16.8 (62.2)	13.8 (56.8)	13.4 (56.1)	24.3 (75.7)
Mean daily maximum °C (°F)	−0.6 (30.9)	−0.4 (31.3)	0.8 (33.4)	4.8 (40.6)	8.5 (47.3)	11.8 (53.2)	13.3 (55.9)	12.8 (55.0)	9.5 (49.1)	5.0 (41.0)	1.2 (34.2)	−0.5 (31.1)	5.5 (41.9)
Daily mean °C (°F)	−4.0 (24.8)	−4.1 (24.6)	−3.3 (26.1)	1.0 (33.8)	4.4 (39.9)	7.5 (45.5)	8.9 (48.0)	8.4 (47.1)	5.4 (41.7)	1.5 (34.7)	−2.0 (28.4)	−3.4 (25.9)	1.7 (35.1)
Mean daily minimum °C (°F)	−7.5 (18.5)	−7.6 (18.3)	−7.1 (19.2)	−2.5 (27.5)	0.5 (32.9)	3.5 (38.3)	5.0 (41.0)	4.8 (40.6)	2.0 (35.6)	−1.6 (29.1)	−5.1 (22.8)	−6.6 (20.1)	−1.8 (28.8)
Record low °C (°F)	−18.1 (−0.6)	−21.0 (−5.8)	−20.9 (−5.6)	−14.2 (6.4)	−8.7 (16.3)	−1.8 (28.8)	0.7 (33.3)	0.0 (32.0)	−3.4 (25.9)	−10.1 (13.8)	−19.3 (−2.7)	−19.4 (−2.9)	−21.0 (−5.8)
Average precipitation mm (inches)	92 (3.6)	92 (3.6)	75 (3.0)	85 (3.3)	74 (2.9)	93 (3.7)	96 (3.8)	126 (5.0)	144 (5.7)	101 (4.0)	123 (4.8)	85 (3.3)	1,186 (46.7)
Average precipitation days (≥ 1 mm)	8	8	7	8	8	9	8	9	9	7	8	8	98
Average relative humidity (%)	65.2	65.0	65.3	67.7	69.6	76.5	80.6	82.2	77.8	73.6	71.5	66.6	71.8
Source 1: Danish Meteorological Institute (2009-2020 temperature & humidity)
Source 2: Climate-Data.org (1991-2021 precipitation)

== Twin towns ==
Narsaq is twinned with:

- Gladsaxe, Denmark
- Vigo, Spain
- Akureyri, Iceland
