= Qassiarsuk =

Settlement in Greenland

Qassiarsuk Bratalid, Brattahlíð
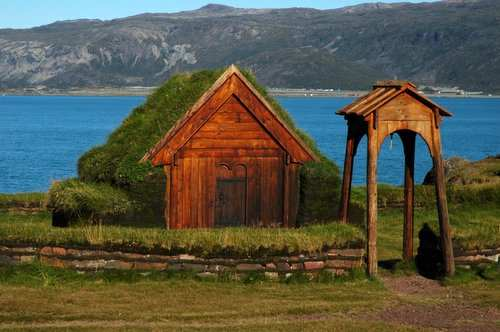
- Reproduction of Brattahlíð church, Qassiarsuk

- Location within Greenland
- Coordinates: 61°8′59″N 45°30′53″W
- State: Kingdom of Denmark
- Constituent country: Greenland
- Municipality: Kujalleq

Government
  - Mayor: Fredrik Frederiksen

Population (2025)
  - Total: 77
- Time zone: UTC−02:00 (Western Greenland Time)
  - Summer (DST): UTC−01:00 (Western Greenland Summer Time)
- Postal code: 3921 Narsaq

Qassiarsuk (Danish: Bratalid from Old Norse Brattahlíð) is a settlement in the Kujalleq municipality, in southern Greenland. Its population was 39 in 2020. Qassiarsuk is part of the Kujataa World Heritage Site, due to its historical importance as the homestead of Erik the Red and its unique testimony to Greenlandic farming.

== History ==
Brattahlíð is located by Tunulliarfik Fjord (Skovfjorden in Danish), and it was the site of Erik the Red's estate in the times of the Norse Eastern Settlement (Østerbygden in Danish). Ruins of several of the buildings, including living quarters, outhouses, and a church, are still clearly visible.

The current village was founded as Greenland's first sheep farm in 1924 and is located in the same place.

Until 31 December 2008, the settlement was part of Narsaq Municipality in the Kitaa amt. On 1 January 2009, Qassiarsuk became part of Kujalleq municipality, when the Kitaa amt, as well as the municipalities of Narsaq, Qaqortoq, and Nanortalik ceased to exist as administrative entities.

== Geography ==
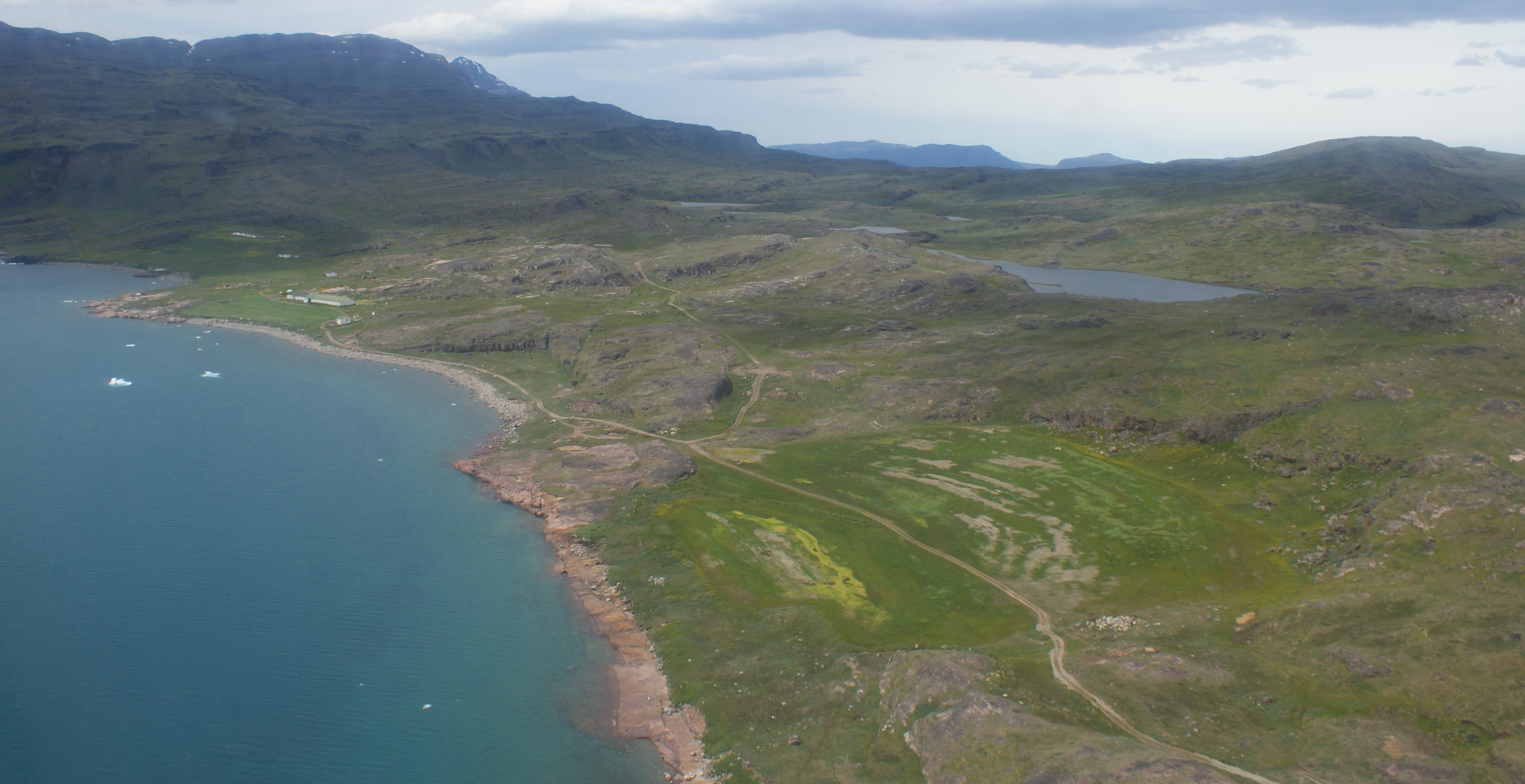
Aerial view of the farms of Qassiarsuk from the north

The settlement is located on Narsaq Peninsula roughly 5 km (3.1 mi) west of Narsarsuaq across the Tunulliarfik Fjord. It has fertile plains wider than those found at Narsaq on the southern end of the peninsula.

== Infrastructure and transportation ==
The settlement has a general store operated by KNI, and there is a youth hostel available for tourists and hikers. There is also a small church.

The electricity needs for the settlement are provided for by a local power station.

=== Transportation ===
The Qassiarsuk area has a relatively extensive network of traversable dirt and gravel roads, totalling over 80 kilometers and requiring DKK 500,000 annually for service. The roads are mainly needed for the sheep farming. The longest stretch of road connects the sheep farms of Qassiarsuk with the airport of Narsarsuaq, around 50 km. The roads are generally of poor construction, lacking crossfall for drainage, and using softer sandstone instead of harder granite, creating severe dust problems in the summer. For general transportation all-terrain vehicles are recommended. Driving between the airport and Qassiarsuk is hard since there is no bridge over the glacial Narsarsuaq river and crossing it is difficult due to deposits of silt quicksand the river carries from the Greenland ice sheet (Greenlandic: Sermersuaq).

All vital transportation at Qassiarsuk is by sea, with boats linking the settlement to Narsarsuaq Airport, home to the only international airport in southern Greenland. The airport primarily functions as a transfer point for passengers heading for the helicopter hubs of Air Greenland in Qaqortoq and Nanortalik. Qassiarsuk does not have its own heliport.

== Economy ==
Qassiarsuk's economy is based on sheep husbandry and farming. This contrasts with the majority of Greenland's settlements, which are based on fishing.

There is also a thriving tourism industry in the area. The Norse ruins in the area and the reconstructed Thodhildur's church of Brattahlid are among the most popular tourist destinations in all of Greenland.

== Population ==
The population of Qassiarsuk has been stable in the last two decades.

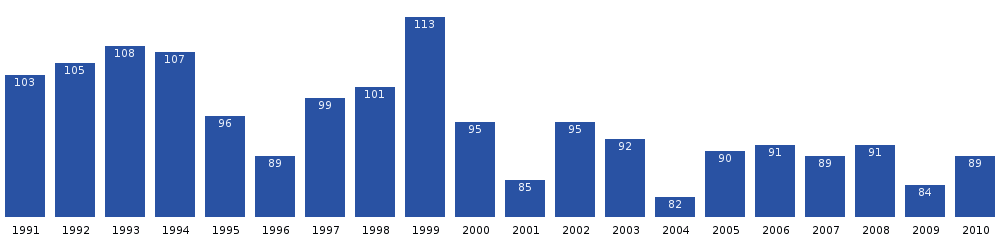
Qassiarsuk population growth dynamics in the last two decades. Source: Statistics Greenland

== In Literature ==
The novel An Old Captivity by Nevil Shute is set in Brattahlíð (spelled "Brattalid" in the book), describing a 1930s archaeological expedition there.
