= Middle Settlement =

Settlement area of Norse Greenland

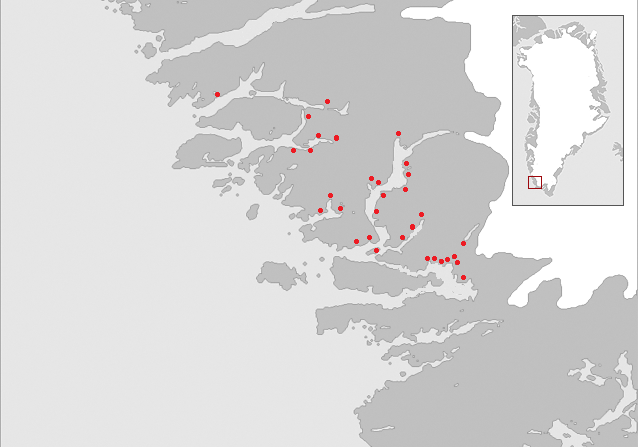
Map of Norse sites in the Middle Settlement

The Middle Settlement (Danish: Mellembygden) was the smallest of the three settlement areas of Norse Greenland, located in the region surrounding the modern community of Arsuk. Associated with the far larger Eastern Settlement about 250 kilometres (160 mi) to the southeast, the area was settled soon after the Norse landnám ('landtaking') in the late 900s, and occupied until the 1300s. About 41 known clusters of ruins have been found in the area, including farms, dwellings, and likely sæters, seasonal satellite pastures for livestock. Sparsely populated and poorly suited for agriculture, no church is known to have been established in the settlement, although priests from Garðar may have occasionally visited. The Thule, ancestors of the Inuit, moved into the area around the 1300s, and may have occupied some abandoned Norse sites.

== History ==
Norse explorers and settlers arrived in Greenland during the late 900s. According to various later Norse chronicles, it was first settled in 985 or 986 by a group of Norwegian and Icelandic colonists led by Erik the Red. During the ensuing landnám ('landtaking'), colonists established farms in two main settlement areas: the Eastern Settlement (Eystribyggð) around the southern tip of Greenland, and the Western Settlement (Vestribyggð) near modern Nuuk. The Eastern Settlement was the larger of the two areas, with between 250 and 500 farms, and served as Greenland's political center. The Western Settlement contained around 60 to 100 farms, and was more reliant on hunting and fishing.

Shortly after the establishment of the main settlement areas, small dwellings and farms were established about 250 kilometres (160 mi) northwest from the Eastern Settlement. Dubbed the "Middle Settlement" (Mellembygden) by archaeologists, the region surrounds the modern settlement of Arsuk, as well as the abandoned modern communities of Ivittuut and Kangilinnguit. This area was seen as an extension of the Eastern Settlement. No churches are known to have been established, likely due to its sparse and scattered population. Priests from Garðar may have visited the area, especially during the early period of settlement. The Middle Settlement was not included within the parishes which were established in the Eastern Settlement by the 13th century.

The Western Settlement was abandoned in the latter half of the 1300s, followed by the Eastern Settlement around a century later. Radiocarbon dating of livestock and reindeer bones from the area attest continued occupancy of the Middle Settlement until at least the 1300s, possibly to the last quarter of the century. During the 1300s, the Thule people—the ancestors of the modern Inuit, known to the Norse as the skræling—began to migrate southward along the western coast of Greenland. They Thule arrived in the Western Settlement around the time of its abandonment, and may have coexisted with the Norse around the Eastern Settlement for a few decades. It is unknown to what extant the Norse and Thule interacted, although the Norse may have traded with them for walrus ivory.

== Archaeology ==
The Middle Settlement is located around a network of fjords surrounded by steep mountains and hillsides. In contrast to the Western and Eastern settlements, the steep topography allowed very little room for agriculture, resulting in all sites being found directly along the coasts. Soils were likely shallower and yearly snowfall likely higher than in either of the larger settlements, resulting in poor agricultural conditions. The inhabitants of the Middle Settlement were likely reliant on hunting and animal husbandry for subsistence. The area contains 41 known clusters of ruins, about half of which have more than 5 structures. Some of these ruin clusters may be the remains of sæters, seasonal satellite pastures for livestock, often with corresponding sheds or dwellings. The remains of seals, cattle, reindeer, sheep, and goats have been found at sites in the settlement.

Among the largest cluster of ruins in the Middle Settlement is at Grønnedal, on Arsuk Fjord. They were discovered by Danish explorer and archaeologist Eigil Knuth in 1945, following the construction of a United States naval base in the area in 1941, which may have damaged the site. Grønnedal consists of the remains of around nine dwellings, as well as a midden. Other major ruin clusters are found at Taylers Havn on Arsuk Fjord and Qinngua and Quassuk on Qoornoq Fjord. Another ruin cluster, found northwest of the other sites at Tissaluup Ilua, contains the remains of six structures, including a dwelling and barn complex. Inuit artifacts such as stone knives and soapstone lamps have been found at the site, suggesting Inuit occupancy following its abandonment by the Norse.

In 1913, a Norse runestone was discovered at Napasut island near the Ikka Fjord, within the Middle Settlement area. Bearing only the name "Øssur Asbjærnarsson", it was suggested to be a tombstone and dated to around 1300. However, the runestone was discovered within the ruins of what was later identified as an Inuit house dating to around the 1700s, and was likely transported there from another area. No evidence of Norse settlement has been found on Napasut. The archaeologist Christian Vebæk surveyed the Middle Settlement, including Grønnedal, during the 1940s and 1950s.
