= Narsaq Municipality =

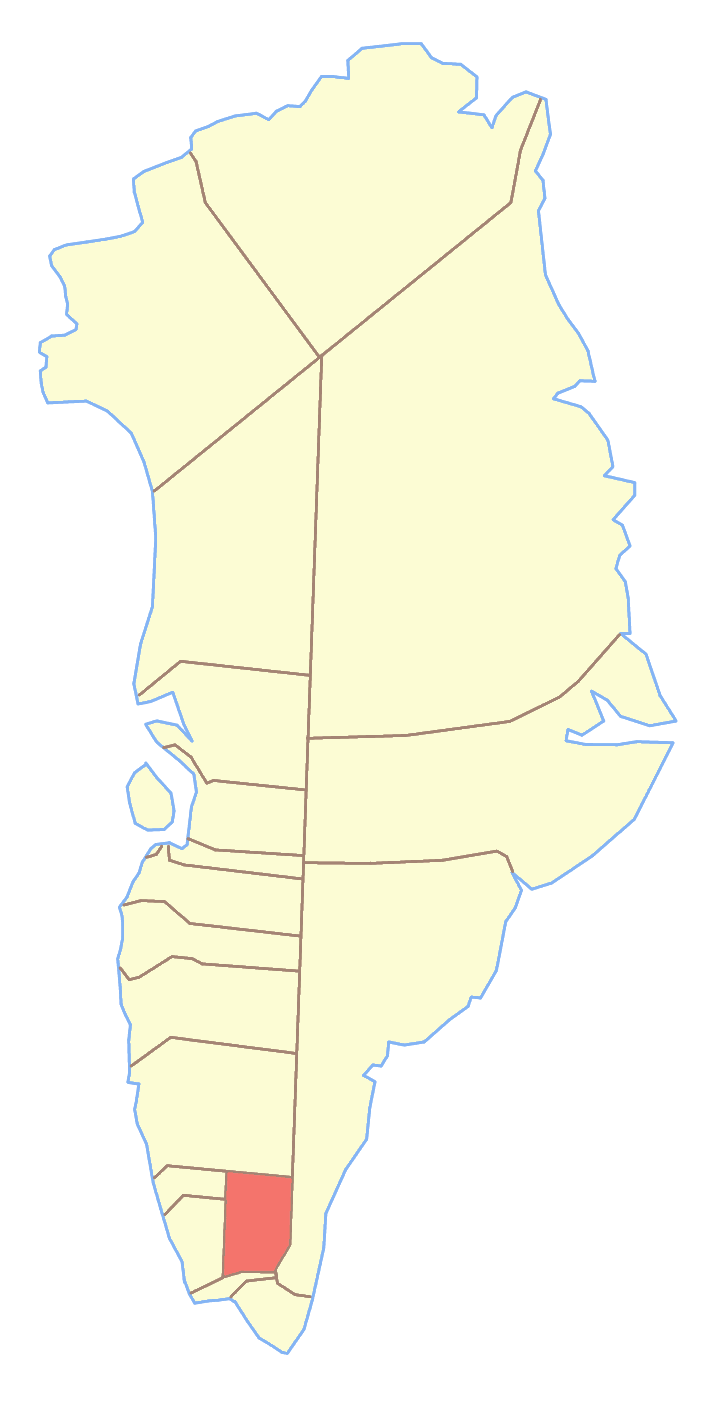
Narsaq municipality

Narsaq Municipality was a municipality in south Greenland until 31 December 2008. The municipality consisted of Narsaq, and the settlements Qassiarsuk, Igaliku, and Narsarsuaq. Its administrative center was the town of Narsaq. It was incorporated into the new Kujalleq municipality on 1 January 2009, when the municipalities of Narsaq, Nanortalik, and Qaqortoq ceased to exist as administrative entities.

The municipality had a population of approximately 2150 people. The size of the municipality was some 8500 km2 of which less than half, or 3000 km2, was open land.
