= Landnám (Greenland) =

Landnám is a "Norse word for taking new land" and also means settlement. The Greenland landnám occurred around the end of the 10th century. Greenland became known to Norseman in 982 CE by Erik the Red who later led a colonizing effort from Iceland to found settlements around 985 CE. Colonies were established in two main settlements referred to by archaeologists as the Eastern and Western settlements. The Eastern settlement was the largest and has produced many archaeological sites suggesting a farming lifestyle including a farm dwelling near modern-day Narsaq referred to as the Landnám homestead or Landnamsgaarden.

Landnamsgaarden was a Norse farmstead in the eastern settlement and it was part of the Viking settlement. It is presently located immediately west of the town of Narsaq.

== Farm - Landnamsgaarden ==
The homestead was founded around the year 1000 AD. It was composed of stables, a banqueting hall and an area to sleep. It is among the oldest Norse ruins in the area.

The total area of the farmstead is small in comparison with Brattahlíð, but it is thought that Erik the Red first settled here before moving to Brattahlíð.
