= Kujataa =

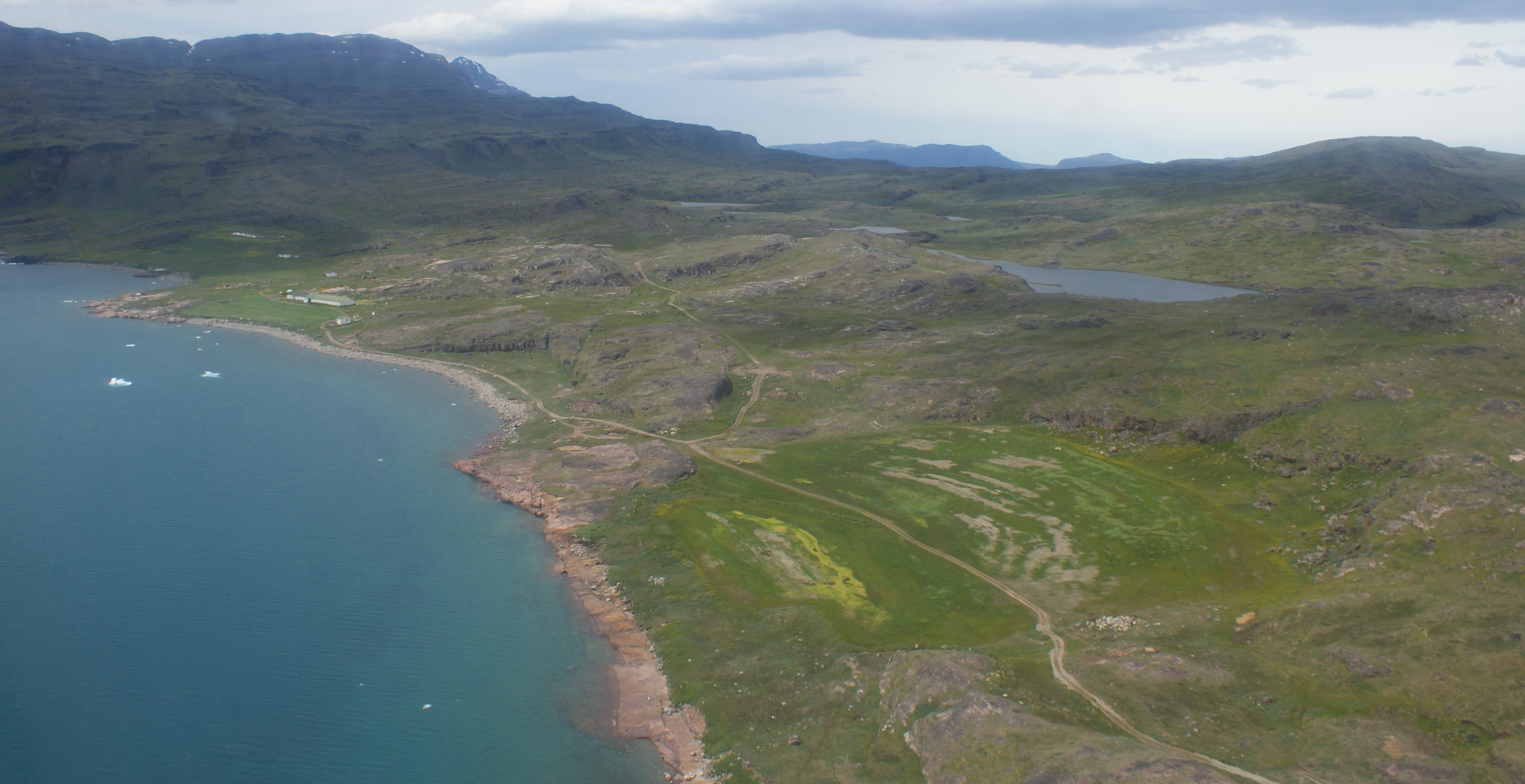
- Aerial view of the farms of Qassiarsuk

- Location within Greenland

Administration
- Greenland
- Municipality: Kujalleq

UNESCO World Heritage Site
- Official name: Kujataa Greenland: Norse and Inuit Farming at the Edge of the Ice Cap
- Criteria: Cultural (V)
- Reference: 1536
- Inscription: 2017 (41st Session)
- Coordinates: 61°9′52″N 45°35′53″W

Kujataa is a sub-arctic farming landscape in Kujalleq, Greenland. It is the first known example of agriculture in the Arctic, and the oldest evidence of the Old Norse culture spreading outside Europe. The unique juxtaposition of farming, hunting, and fishing that occurred in the region from the 10th through 15th centuries and from the 18th century to today headlined the region's inscription on the UNESCO World Heritage List in 2017 as Kujataa Greenland: Norse and Inuit Farming at the Edge of the Ice Cap.

== Description ==
Kujataa stretches from Nunap Isua in the south to Nunarsuit Island, roughly 250 kilometers to the north. The world heritage site includes 5 components, all located within this region:

- Qassiarsuk: Contains Brattahlíð, the estate of Erik the Red and (possibly) the first church in the Americas.
- Igaliku: Contains Garðar, which was the seat of the bishopric in Greenland, as well as the location of the first modern Inuit farm in Greenland.
- Sissarluttoq: Contains a particularly large Norse manor house, with the remains of over 40 structures.
- Tasikuluulik (Vatnahverfi): Contains Greenland's longest rural road, which connects multiple Inuit sheep farms.
- Qaqortukulooq (Hvalsey): Contains 11 Norse and 2 Thule sites, including the best preserved Norse ruin in Greenland and the site of the last recorded mention of Europeans in Greenland in 1408.

== History ==
The earliest known archeological remains from Kujataa date from the 3rd millennium BC, beginning with the Arctic small tool tradition and continuing with the Saqqaq and Dorset cultures, before vanishing from southern Greenland. In the 10th century, the Norse people began to arrive in southern Greenland, led by Erik the Red. Finding deep fjords suitable for agriculture in the Kujataa region, they quickly established small farming settlements, naming the area Eystribyggð (Eastern Settlement). However, the Norse farming practices on Greenland differed from those elsewhere with a greater emphasis on hunting than cereal production (possibly due to the abundance of walruses and seals in the region) and raising goats rather than sheep. Irrigation systems were also built in order to feed the livestock, some of which remain as the only surviving medieval irrigation systems in the North Atlantic.

At its peak in the 13th century, Eystribyggð had its own bishop and contained 200-300 farms. During that time, the Thule people migrated to Greenland and came into contact with the Norse settlers. This period of coexistence may have lasted for up to 250 years. By the 15th century, the Norse villages in Kujataa had disappeared, and there is little sign of agriculture in Greenland for the next few centuries, until the 1780s, when an Inuk woman, Tuperna, and her Norwegian husband, Anders Olsen, began a farm at the former medieval bishop's residence at Igaliku. This area has been continually farmed since then.
