= Atlantic Bridge (flight route) =

Flight route between Newfoundland and Scotland

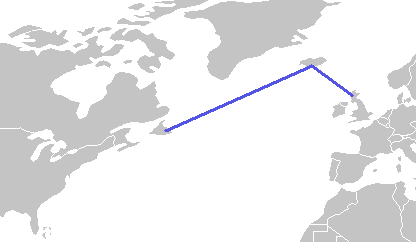
Map of the route

The Atlantic Bridge is a flight route from Gander International Airport in Gander, Newfoundland, Canada, to Scotland, with a refueling stop in Iceland (usually Keflavík International Airport). Traditionally, the Scottish airport most associated with the Atlantic Bridge has been Prestwick International Airport, owing to its long association with US and Canadian military traffic.

During the Second World War, new bombers flew this route. Today, it is seldom used for commercial aviation, since modern jet airliners can fly a direct route from Canada or the United States to Europe without the need for a fueling stop. However, smaller private or military aircraft which do not have the necessary range to make a direct crossing of the ocean still routinely use this route, or may alternatively stop in Greenland, typically via Narsarsuaq and Kulusuk or the Azores for refueling. The most common users of this route are ferry pilots delivering light aeroplanes (often six seats or fewer) to new owners. Smaller commercial jet airliners with insufficient range to make the crossing were once ferried this way but is becoming less common as fuel efficiency has improved over the years – for example the latest versions of the Boeing 737 and Airbus A320 can now comfortably cross the ocean directly (even with a full passenger load) with no need for a refuelling stop.

This route is longer overall than the direct route and involves an extra landing and takeoff, which is costly in fuel terms. However, the Icelandic carrier Icelandair strongly markets the Atlantic Bridge as part of its business model (allowing for free stopovers in Iceland to encourage tourism) by joining major US and Canadian hubs with Western European destinations via its base at Keflavík International Airport.

== See also ==
- Transatlantic flight
