= Dyrnæs =

Norse settlement in Greenland

- Location of Dyrnæs in Greenland
- 60.941°0′0″N 46.048°0′0″W
- Associated with: Norsemen
- Location: North of Narsaq, Greenland
- Region: Greenland

Site notes
- Excavation dates: 1932

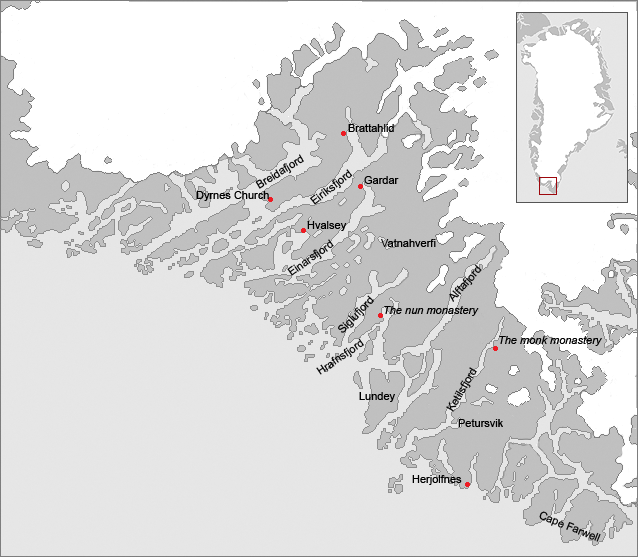
Location of Dyrnæs in the Eastern Settlement.

Dyrnæs was a Norse settlement in Eastern Settlement in Greenland. It was located to the north of modern-day Narsaq.

== History ==
According to Ívar Bárðarson, Dyrnæs was one of the largest parishes in Norse Greenland. It consisted of a church and several farms, and probably covered the entire western part of the Narsaq peninsula. The ruins of the church were discovered during an archaeological dig in 1932.
