= Tunulliarfik Fjord =

Fjord in Greenland

- Location in Greenland
- Location: Arctic
- Coordinates: 60°59′N 45°35′W
- Ocean/sea sources: Labrador Sea
- Basin countries: Greenland
- Max. length: 60 km (37 mi)
- Max. width: 6.5 km (4.0 mi)

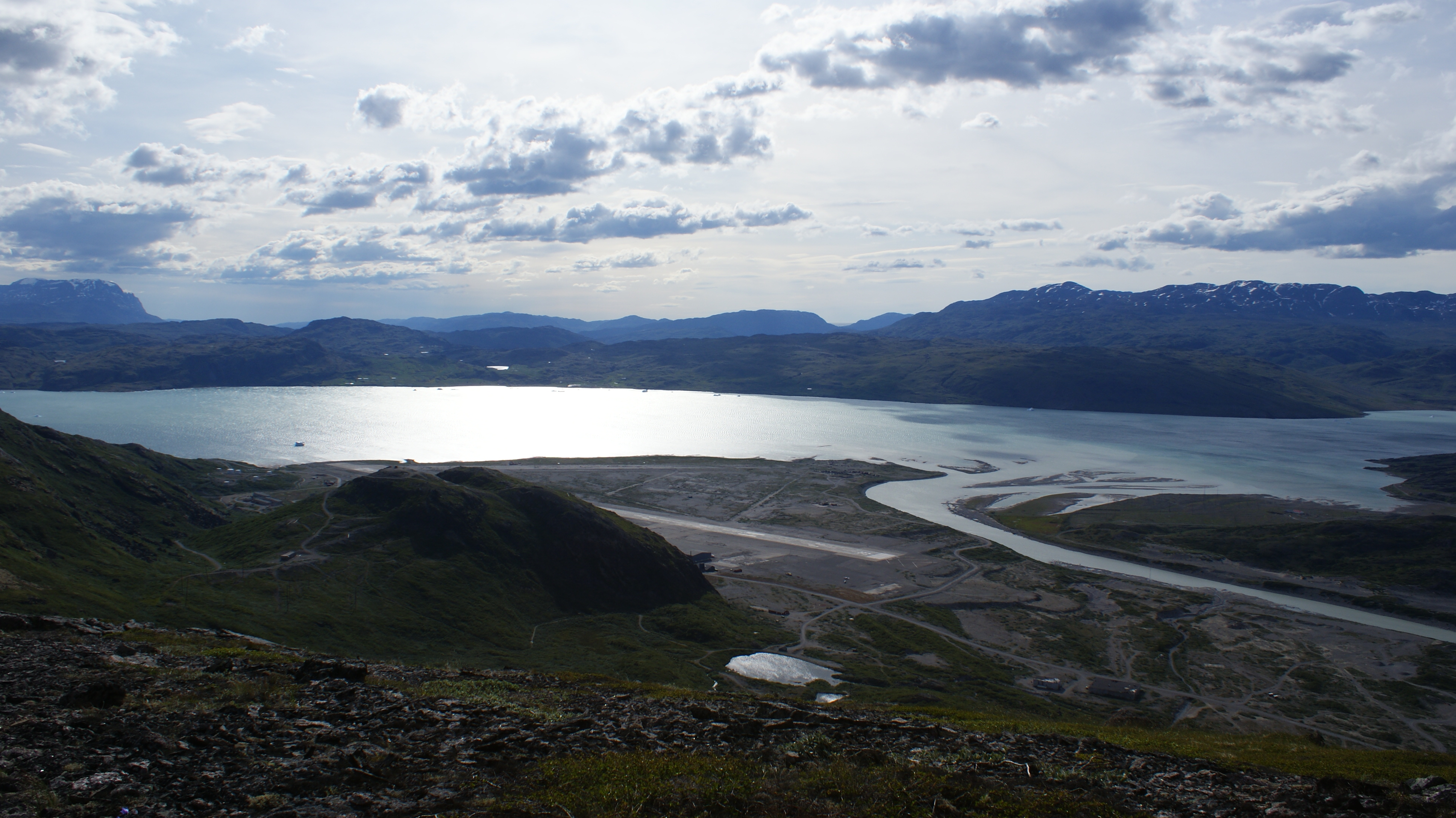
Upper Tunulliarfik Fjord seen from Mellemlandet ridge above Narsarsuaq

Tunulliarfik Fjord (old spelling: Tunugdliarfik; Danish: Eriksfjord) is a fjord near Qaqortoq in the Kujalleq municipality in southern Greenland. It is the inner section of Skovfjord (Skovfjorden). In times of the Norse settlement in southern Greenland, it was known as Eiriksfjord.

== Geography ==
The fjord head at approximately 61°14′40″N 45°30′35″W is formed by the estuary of a river flowing from the glacial outflow lake in Johan Dahl Land. At approximately 61°04′00″N 45°26′30″W, south of the Narsarsuaq settlement, the fjord is joined by its tributary Qooroq Fjord from the northeast, changing direction from southern into southwestern. Bounded by long peninsulas and low-lying islands from the southeast and the northwest, it has its mouth in the Skovfjord which empties into the Labrador Sea at approximately 60°41′N 46°44′W.

The Narsaq Sound, between the peninsula forming the northern shore of Tunulliarfik Fjord and Tuttutooq and Illutaliq islands, connects with neighbouring Bredefjord and Nordre Sermilik to the north.

== Settlement ==
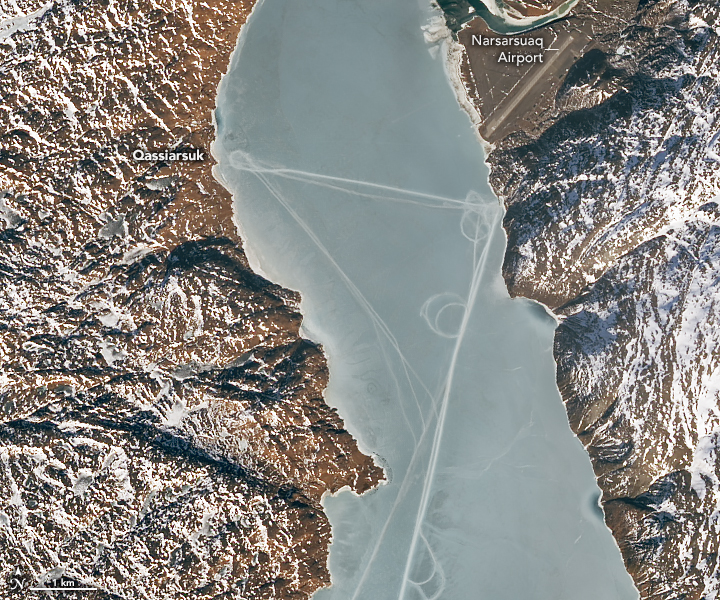
Likely snow machine tracks across the frozen fjord, March 2023. Narsarsuaq Airport is at upper right. NASA Earth Observatory satellite photograph.

There are several small settlements near the shores of the long Tunulliarfik Fjord. Narsarsuaq and Qassiarsuk are located on the opposite sides of the fjord near its head. Further south, the settlement of Igaliku occupies the isthmus of a peninsula bounding the fjord from the south. At the far end of Narsaq Peninsula bounding the upper reaches of the fjord from the north the town of Narsaq occupies a wide lowland with arable ground. There are no settlements in the lower reaches of the fjord.

== Transport ==
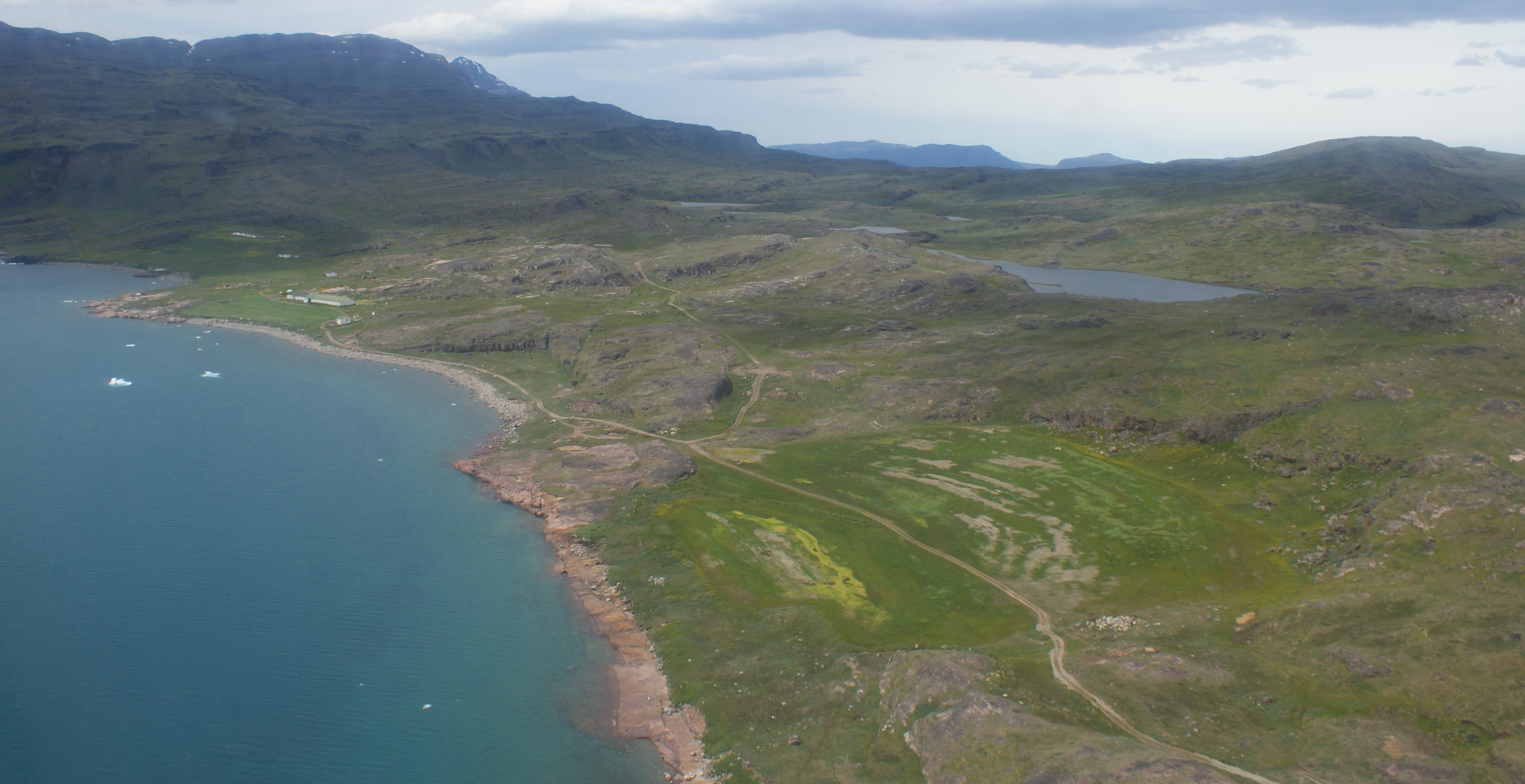
Farms of Qassiarsuk on the northwestern shore of Tunulliarfik

Narsaq is a port of call for the Arctic Umiaq Line coastal ship in the summer season. The southbound ferry route backtracks from Qaqortoq until the mouth of Tunulliarfik, to then sail northeast alongside the lower part of the fjord, anchoring at Narsaq port before turning around the same day.

Narsaq Heliport and the international Narsarsuaq Airport operate year-round, with STOL connections to Nuuk, Kangerlussuaq, and Paamiut, and helicopter connections to Alluitsup Paa, Nanortalik, and Qaqortoq. Igaliku and Qassiarsuk can be reached by boat.

== See also ==
- List of fjords of Greenland
