= An Old Captivity =

1940 novel by Nevil Shute

- First US edition
- Author: Nevil Shute
- Language: English
- Publisher: William Heinemann (UK); William Morrow (US)
- Publication date: 1940
- Publication place: United Kingdom
- Media type: Print (Hardcover)

An Old Captivity is a novel by British author Nevil Shute. It was first published in the UK in 1940 by William Heinemann.

== Plot summary ==
The principal character is a young Scottish pilot with bush-flying experience in Canada, Donald Ross, who is hired by an Oxford don, Cyril Lockwood, to pilot an air survey mission of Brattalid in Greenland. Lockwood's interest is in the early Viking seafarers and their exploits, and although he appears to have little knowledge of the needs of such a project, he insists on their starting as soon as possible, with his elder brother David, a businessman, providing finance.

Ross, as the hired expert, then has to contend with the 'helpful' suggestions from both the financier and Lockwood's young daughter, Alix. This causes early tensions in the preparatory stages.

While the preliminary dig is ongoing Ross shoulders much responsibility including keeping the aircraft safe in a tidal zone. Worn out with the expedition's work – all of which has fallen solely on him – and a prolonged lack of sleep induced by worry over the expedition, he enters a coma induced by the sleeping tablets he has been forced to take to keep going, and in it dreams that he and Alix were once Scottish slaves aboard Leif Ericson's vessel on its voyage of discovery to Greenland. A part of this dream includes the leaving behind by the two slaves of a stone, with their names carved on it, at the Viking explorers' landing point in North America.

Ross recovers and tells Alix and the don of his dreams. The last remnant of photographic survey is successfully completed, and the three complete their air crossing to North America, making landfall in eastern Canada. Flying down the coast towards New York Ross recognizes where he dreamed Leif Ericson's expedition landed on the coast of Cape Cod; they land to investigate and find the stone with the slaves' names on it.

The technical details of a trans-Atlantic flight of this period (late 1930s) are accurate and of interest. The type of aircraft is a fictional radial-engined floatplane intended for bush use, made by a fictional Detroit firm named Cosmos. It corresponds roughly to the performance of a Noorduyn Norseman.

This was Shute's first attempt at re-incarnation as a plot, a second later work on this theme is In the Wet.
