= Anders Olsen =

Anders Olsen (1718–1786) was a Norwegian trader, explorer and colonial administrator, who founded several important towns in Greenland including Qaqortoq (Julianehåb) and Maniitsoq (Sukkertoppen) as well as the village of Igaliku.

Anders Olsen was born on the island of Senja, Norway. In the autumn of 1741 they traveled to Copenhagen, and the next spring they went on to Greenland. Together with his brother Anders Olsen, he came to Godthåb, which was built by Hans Egede in 1721 There they were employed by Jacob Sørensen Severin (1691–1753), the Danish merchant who held a trade monopoly on Greenland from 1733 to 1749.

General Trade Company, which was founded on 4 September 1747, and in 1750 received a full monopoly on trade in Greenland taking over the operation of the general trading company. In 1754, Olsen established a trading colony at Fiskenesset south of Godthåb. In 1755, he was given the task of establishing and managing a trading colony at Sukkertoppe which was north of Godthåb. Olsen remained at Sukkertoppen until 1773. Anders Olsen left Sukkertoppen to establish a colony in the south in 1773. He set off on a reconnaissance journey with a son and came to colonization Julianehåb where he stayed until 1780.

In 1752 he married the Greenlandic woman Tupernat and eventually had six children with her. He died during 1786 at Igaliko, Greenland.

== Other Sources ==
- Heinz Barüske (1990), Grönland: Kultur und Landschaft am Polarkreis (in German), Köln: DuMont, ISBN 3-7701-1544-9
