= Kitaa =

Former administrative division of Greenland

Coordinates: 68°00′N 52°00′W

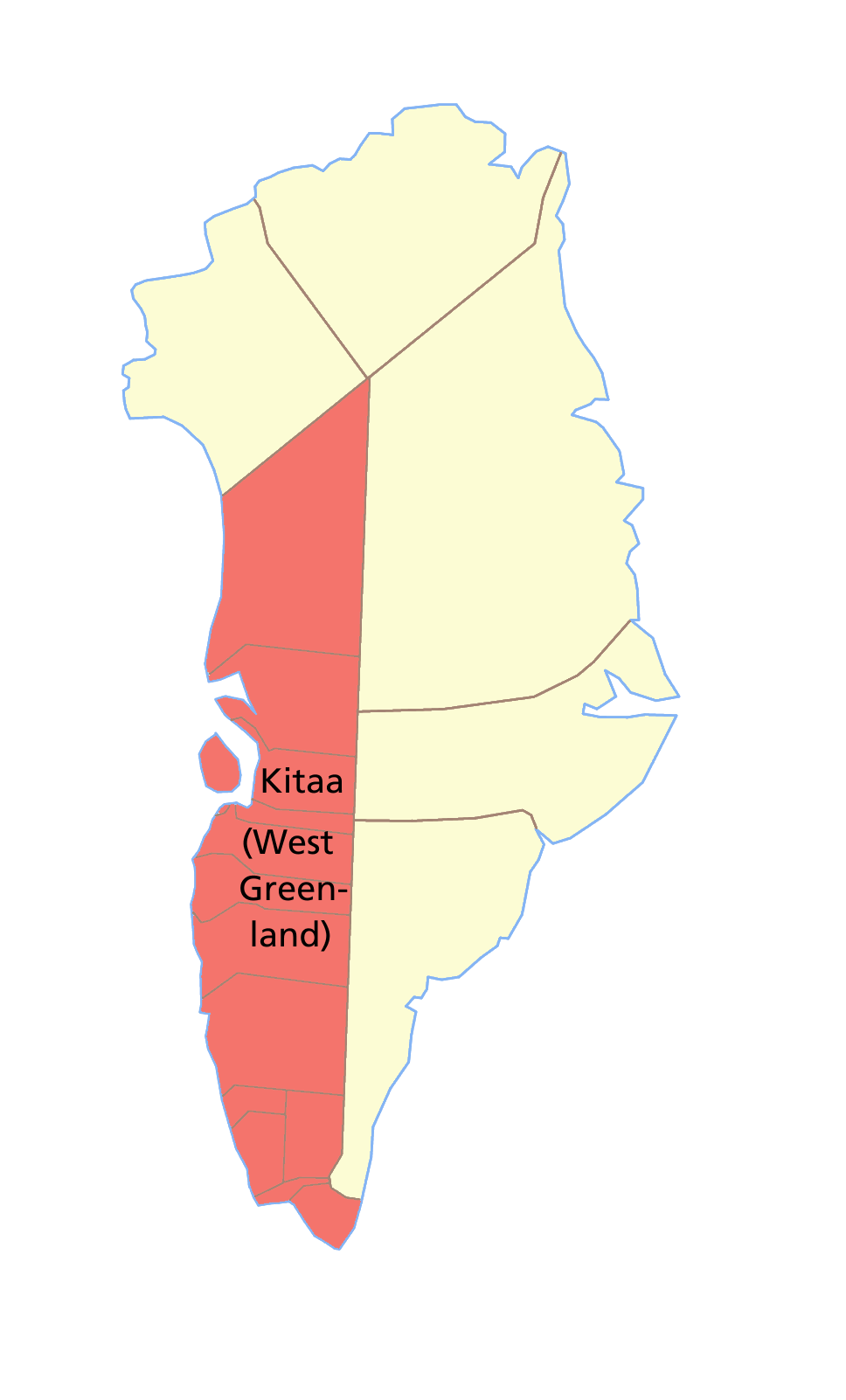
Map of West Greenland

Kitaa, originally Vestgrønland ("West Greenland"), is a former administrative division of Greenland. It was by far the most populated of the divisions, being home to almost 90% of the total population. The divisions were de facto replaced by statistical regions after Greenland received home rule in 1979.

It is bordered in the west by the Baffin Bay, Davis Strait, Labrador Sea and the North Atlantic Ocean. To the east lies Tunu.

All but three of the island territory's municipalities were located in West Greenland. These were (in geographical order, from south to north):

- Nanortalik
- Qaqortoq
- Narsaq
- Ivittuut
- Paamiut
- Nuuk
- Maniitsoq
- Sisimiut
- Kangaatsiaq
- Aasiaat
- Qasigiannguit
- Ilulissat
- Qeqertarsuaq
- Uummannaq
- Upernavik

== See also ==
- Subdivisions of the Nordic countries
- Administrative divisions of Greenland
- Isua Greenstone Belt (geology)
