= Igaliku =

Igaliku Garðar, Igaliko
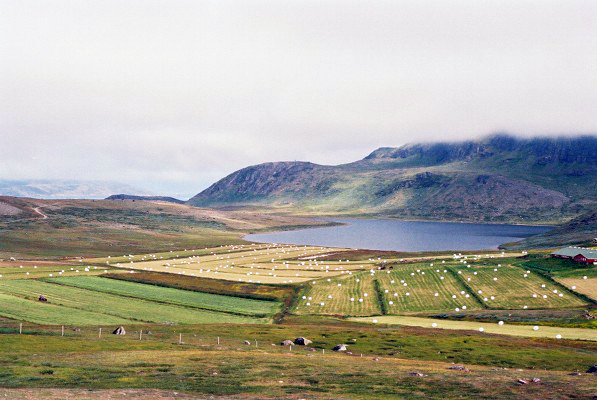

- Location within Greenland
- Coordinates: 60°59′16″N 45°25′15″W
- State: Kingdom of Denmark
- Constituent country: Greenland
- Municipality: Kujalleq
- Founded: 1783

Government
  - Mayor: Klaus Egede

Population (2025)
  - Total: 31
- Time zone: UTC−02:00 (Western Greenland Time)
  - Summer (DST): UTC−01:00 (Western Greenland Summer Time)
- Postal code: 3921 Narsaq

Igaliku is a settlement in the Kujalleq municipality in southern Greenland. The town was founded as Igaliko in 1783 by the trader and colonial administrator Anders Olsen and his Greenlandic wife, Tuperna. In 2020, Igaliku had 21 inhabitants. The nearby Norse ruins of Garðar and the farms surrounding the town were inscribed on the UNESCO World Heritage List in 2017 as part of the Kujataa Greenland: Norse and Inuit Farming at the Edge of the Ice Cap site.

== Geography ==
Igaliku is located southeast of Narsarsuaq, on a peninsula jutting off the mainland of Greenland near the eastern shore of upper Tunulliarfik Fjord. Access to Igaliku from Narsarsauq is cheaper and easier by landing at the small harbor of Itilleq and then crossing the isthmus 4 km (2.5 mi).

== Landmarks and sights ==
Igaliku is best known for the ruins of Garðar, once the religious heart of 12th-century Norse Greenland. The area was at the very heart of the Eastern Settlement and has been extensively archaeologically excavated since the 1830s. There are several historical graves in the area, although most have not presently been identified. The nearby area was documented by New York fine art photographer, Steve Giovinco, as part of a grant from the Scandinavian-American Foundation.

== Infrastructure ==
The settlement has a general store, a church including the congregation building, and a school, Atuarfik Igaliku (Greenlandic for "the school of Igaliku"). There is only one road into the village (called King's Road), which connects Igaliku to a small dock at the farming settlement, Itilleq.

== Population ==
The population of Igaliku has been stable in the last two decades.

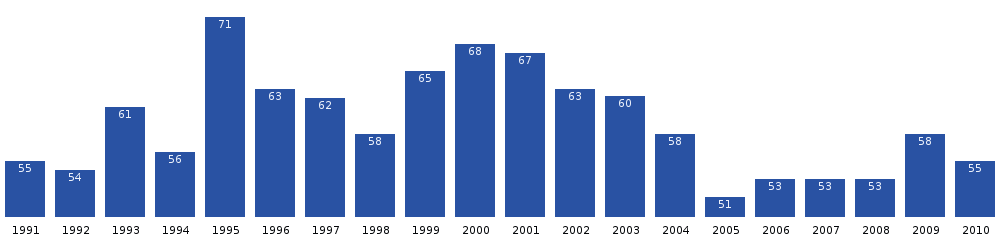
Igaliku population growth dynamics in the last two decades. Source: Statistics Greenland

== Climate ==
Igaliku has a tundra climate (ET) with cool summers and cold winters.

Climate data for Igaliku (1982-2012)
Month	Jan	Feb	Mar	Apr	May	Jun	Jul	Aug	Sep	Oct	Nov	Dec	Year
Mean daily maximum °C (°F)	−2.5 (27.5)	−1.6 (29.1)	−0.9 (30.4)	3.3 (37.9)	8.5 (47.3)	11.8 (53.2)	13.7 (56.7)	12.9 (55.2)	8.8 (47.8)	3.8 (38.8)	0.5 (32.9)	−1.9 (28.6)	4.7 (40.4)
Daily mean °C (°F)	−6.4 (20.5)	−5.5 (22.1)	−4.8 (23.4)	−0.4 (31.3)	4.6 (40.3)	7.6 (45.7)	9.5 (49.1)	8.9 (48.0)	5.4 (41.7)	0.8 (33.4)	−2.8 (27.0)	−5.6 (21.9)	0.9 (33.7)
Mean daily minimum °C (°F)	−10.2 (13.6)	−9.4 (15.1)	−8.6 (16.5)	−4.1 (24.6)	0.8 (33.4)	3.5 (38.3)	5.4 (41.7)	4.9 (40.8)	2 (36)	−2.2 (28.0)	−6.1 (21.0)	−9.3 (15.3)	−2.8 (27.0)
Average precipitation mm (inches)	58 (2.3)	50 (2.0)	53 (2.1)	54 (2.1)	50 (2.0)	67 (2.6)	79 (3.1)	84 (3.3)	94 (3.7)	72 (2.8)	81 (3.2)	73 (2.9)	815 (32.1)
Source: Time and Date
