= Narsaq Heliport =

Heliport in southern Greenland

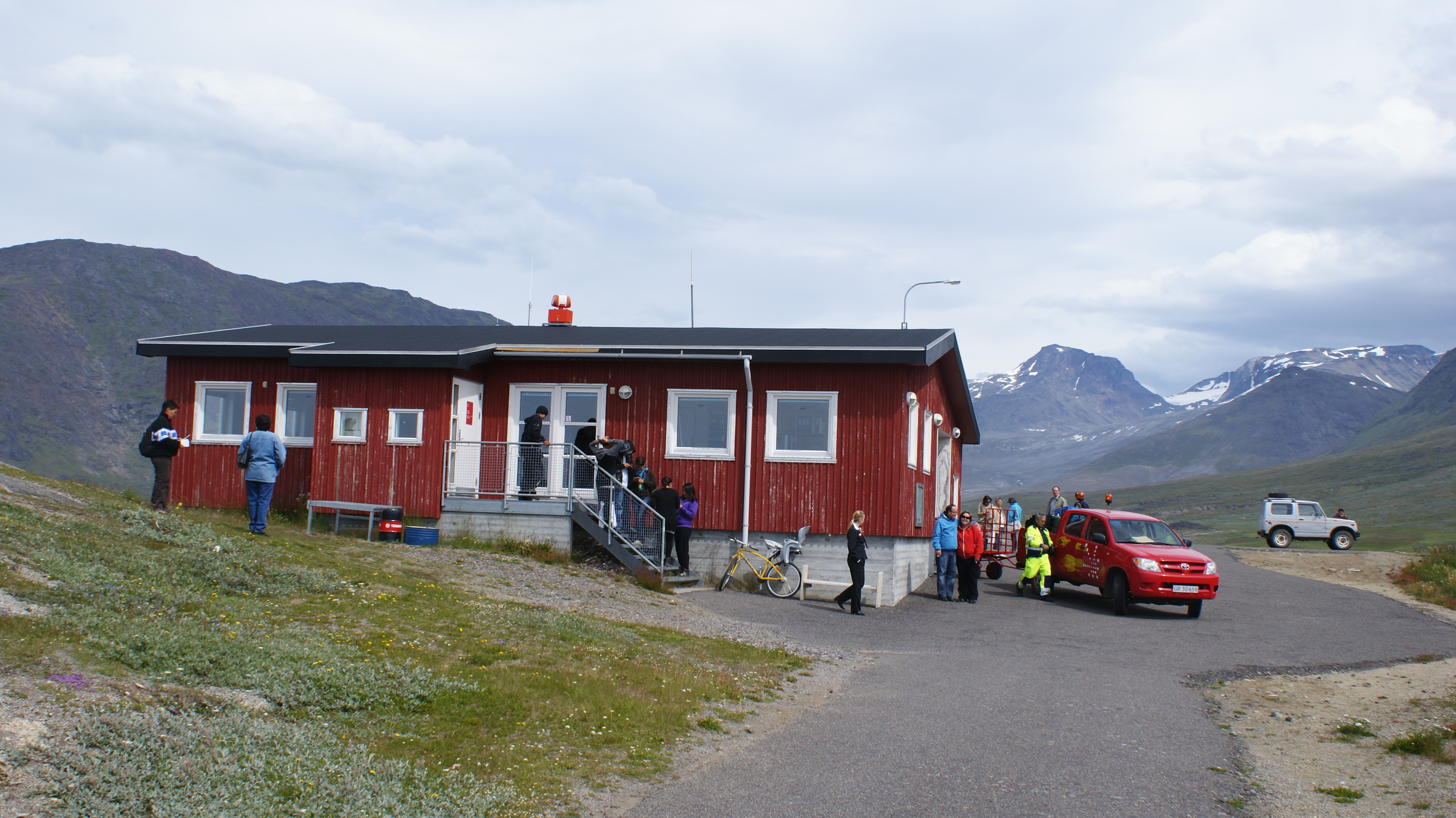
- IATA: JNS; ICAO: BGNS

Summary
- Airport type: Public
- Operator: Greenland Airport Authority (Mittarfeqarfiit)
- Serves: Narsaq, Greenland
- Elevation AMSL: 83 ft / 25 m
- Coordinates: 60°55′00″N 046°03′31″W
- Website: Narsaq Heliport

Map
- Location in Greenland

Helipads
| Number | Length | | Surface |
| Number | m | ft | Surface |
|---|---|---|---|
| H1 | 9 (radius) | 30 (radius) | Asphalt |
- Source: Danish AIS

Narsaq Heliport (IATA: JNS, ICAO: BGNS) is a heliport in the northwestern part of Narsaq, a town in the Kujalleq municipality, in southern Greenland.

== Airlines and destinations ==
| Airlines | Destinations |
|---|---|
| Air Greenland | Qaqortoq |

== Photographs ==
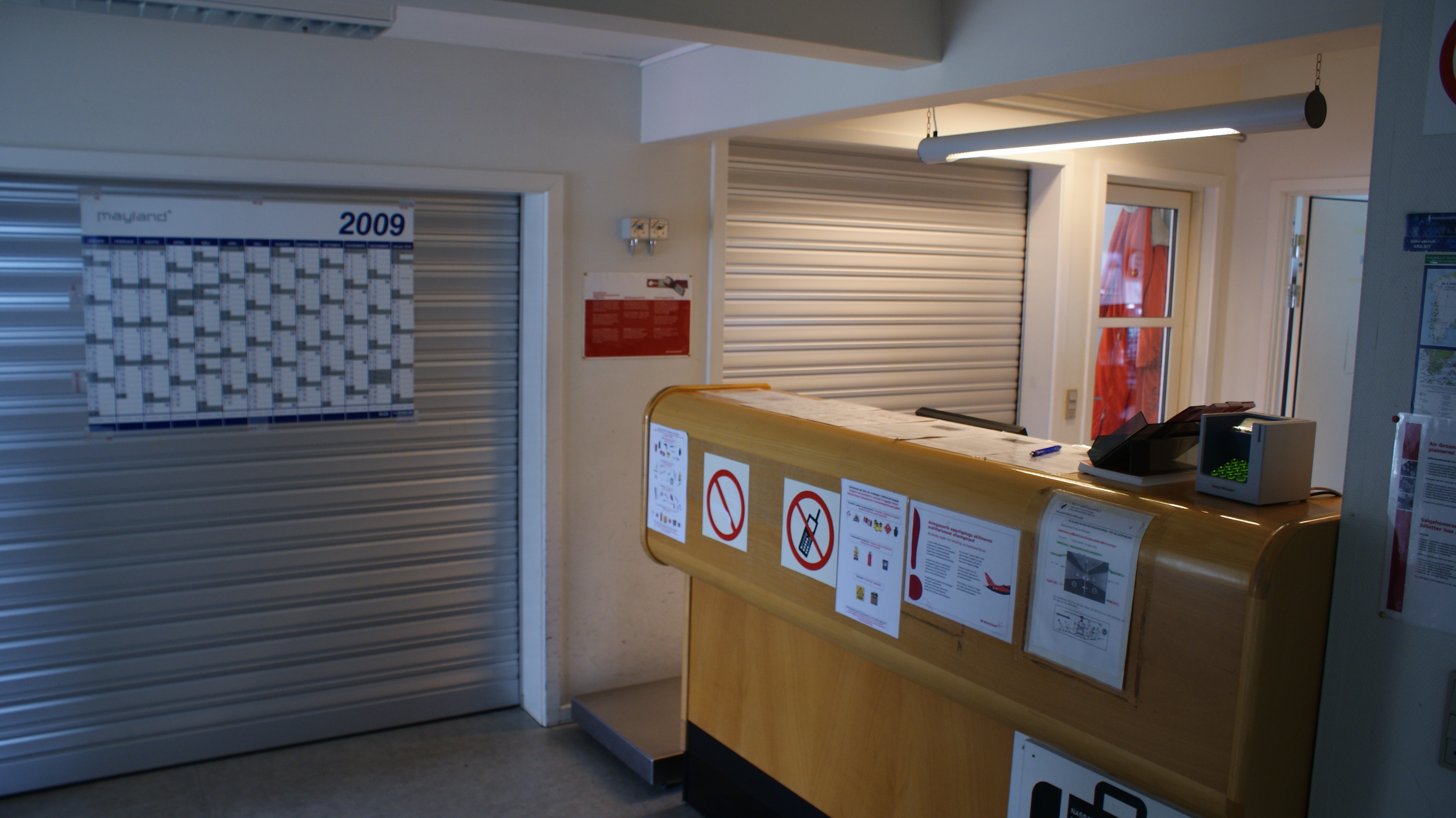
Air Greenland check-in desk

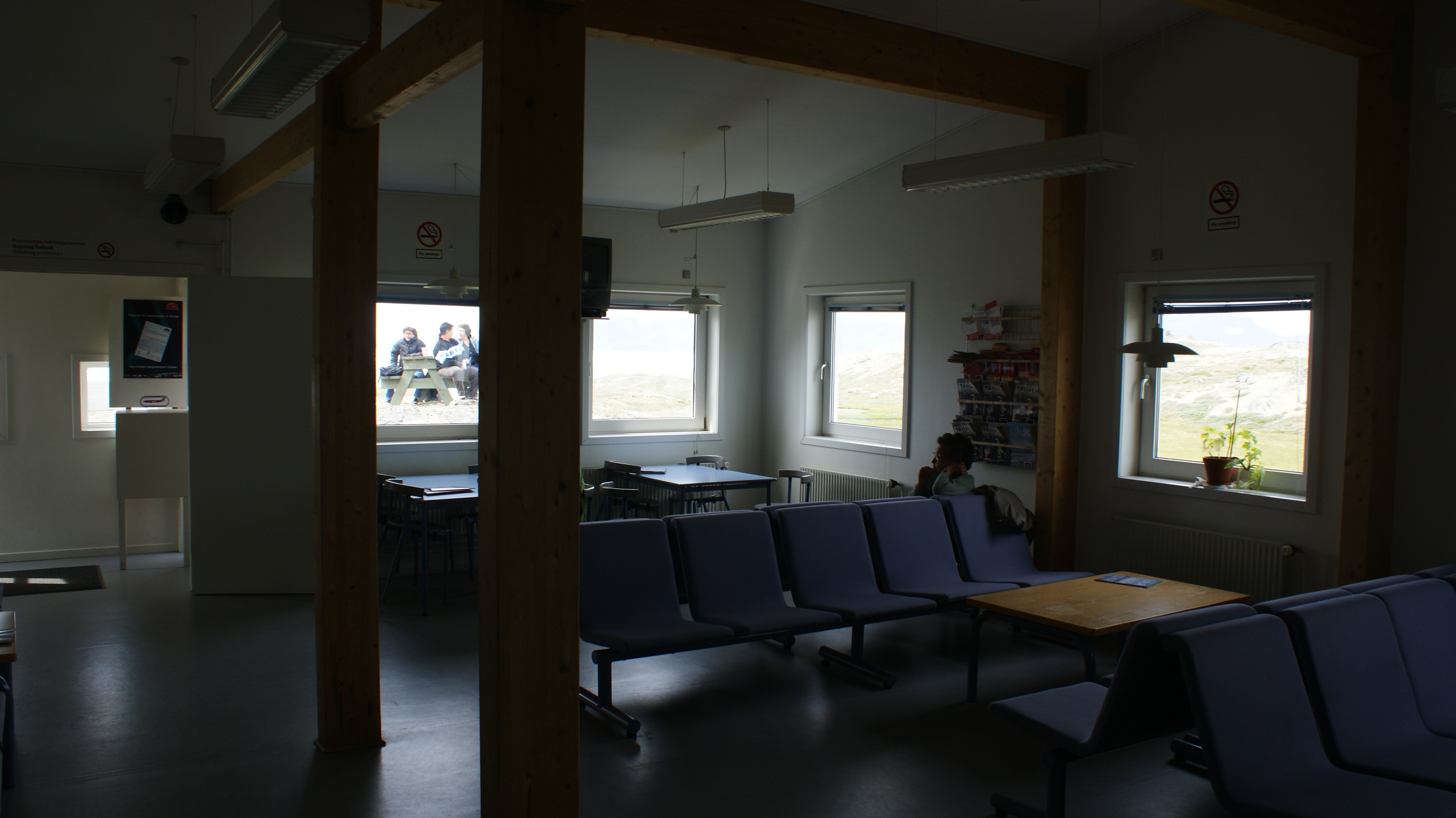
Departure lounge

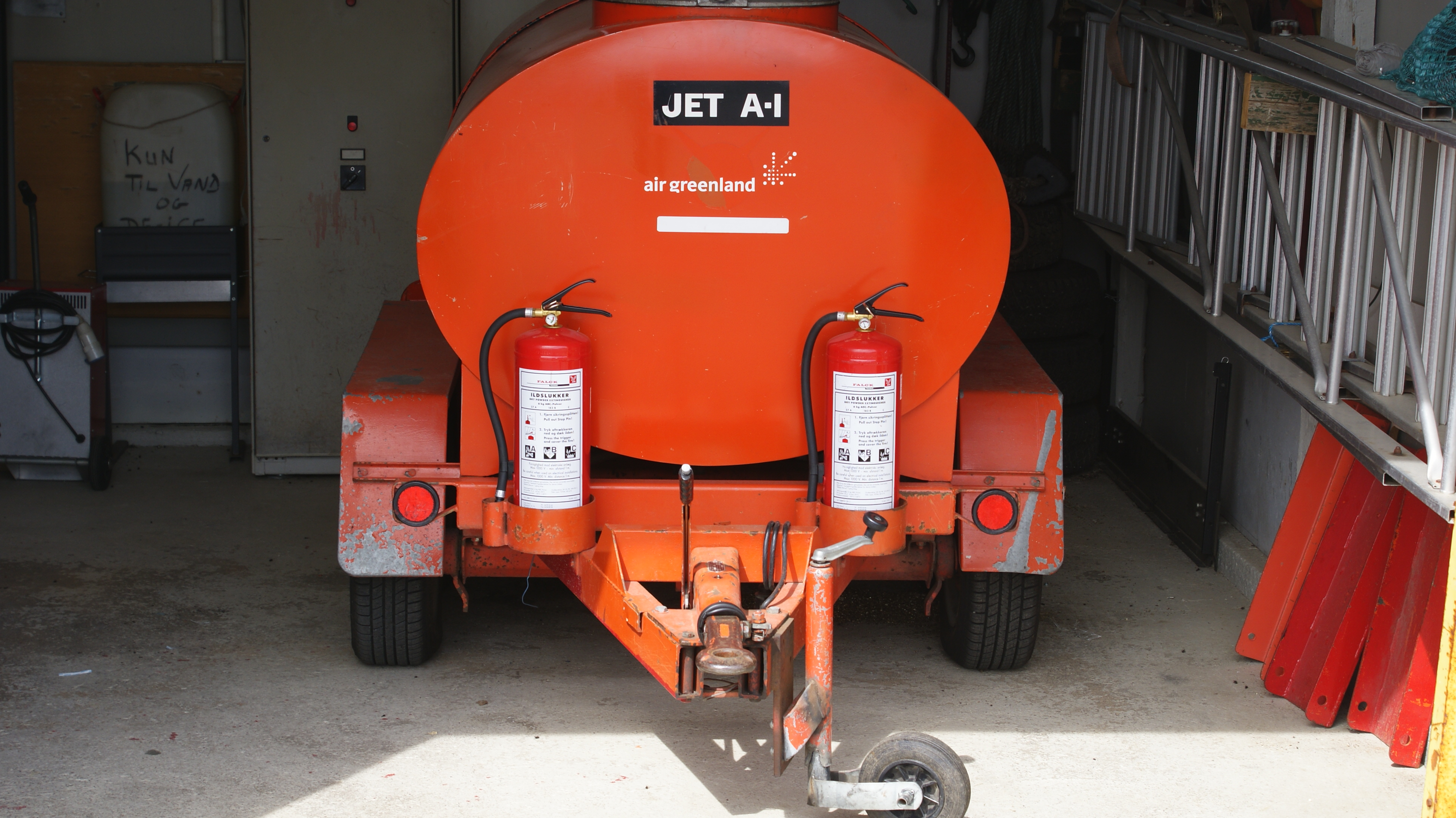
Fuel truck by the entrance

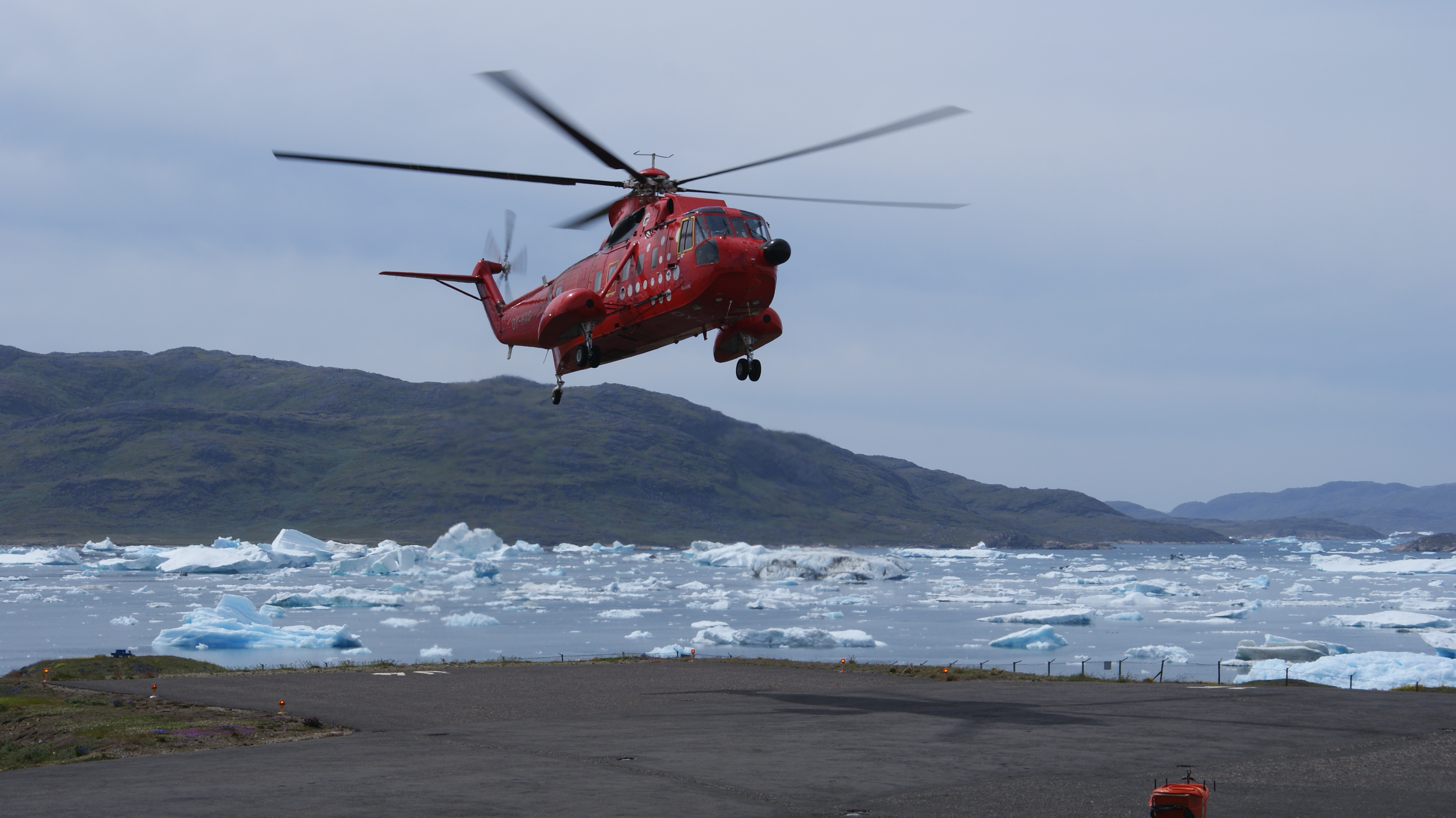
Air Greenland Sikorsky S-61N helicopter, incoming from Qaqortoq Heliport, bound for Narsarsuaq Airport

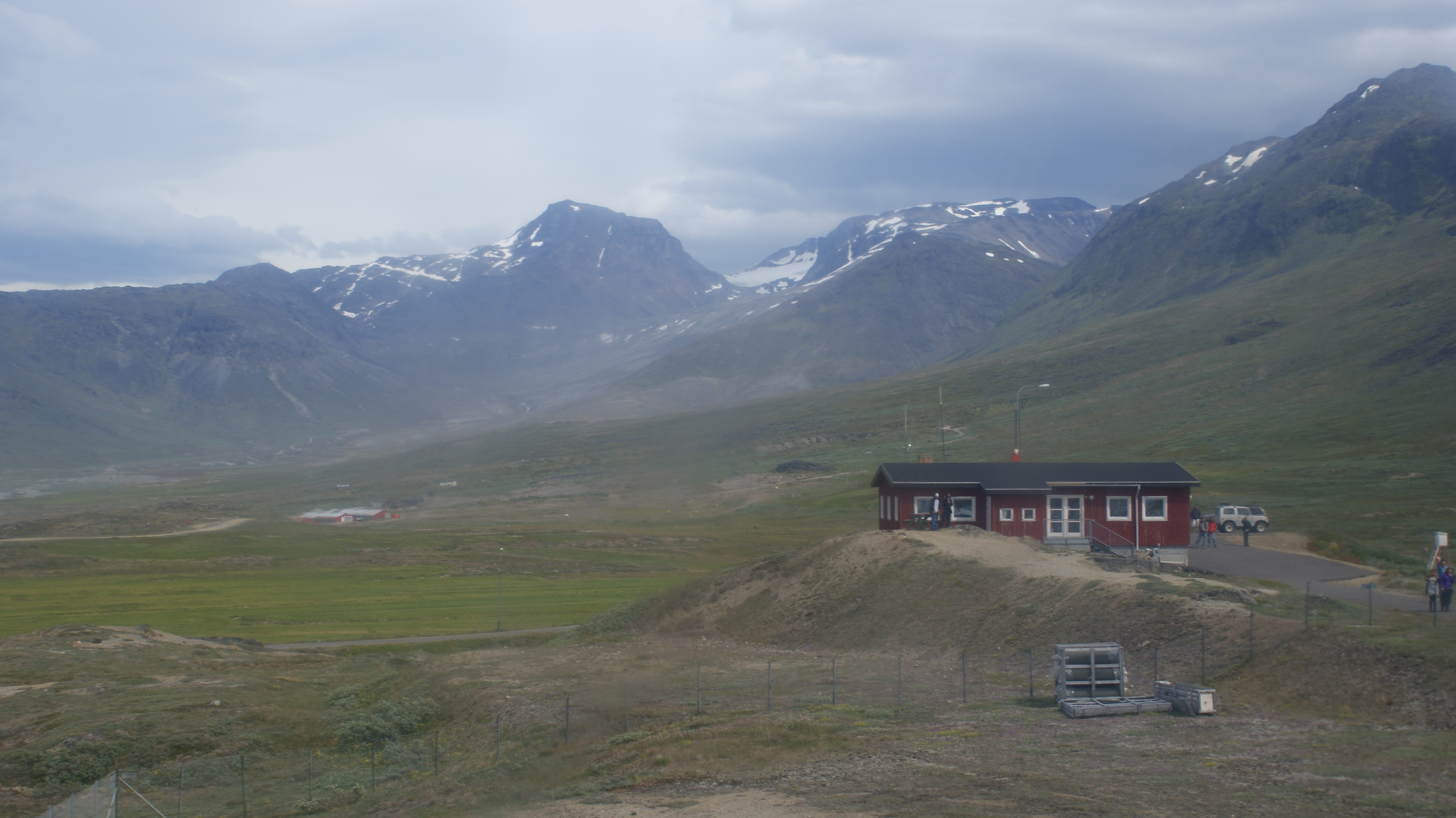
Heliport from the air during Narsaq-Narsarsuaq flight in the Air Greenland Sikorsky S-61N helicopter
