= Brattahlíð =

Archaeological site in Greenland

- Brattahlid
- Location of Brattahlíð in Greenland
- 61°09′08″N 45°30′54″W
- Associated with: Norsemen
- Location: 5 km Southwest from Narsarsuaq, Greenland
- Region: Greenland

UNESCO World Heritage Site
- Part of: Kujataa Greenland: Norse and Inuit Farming at the Edge of the Ice Cap
- Criteria: Cultural: v
- Reference: 1536-001
- Inscription: 2017 (41st Session)

Brattahlíð (Old Norse pronunciation: [ˈbrɑttɑˌhliːð]), often anglicised as Brattahlid, was Erik the Red's estate in the Eastern Settlement Viking colony he established in south-western Greenland toward the end of the 10th century. The present settlement of Qassiarsuk is now located on the former estate. The site is about 96 km (60 mi) from the ocean, at the head of the Tunulliarfik Fjord, and hence sheltered from ocean storms.

Erik and his descendants lived there until about the mid-15th century. The name Brattahlíð means "the steep slope". The estate, along with other archeological sites in southwestern Greenland, was inscribed on the UNESCO World Heritage List in 2017 as Kujataa Greenland: Norse and Inuit Farming at the Edge of the Ice Cap.

== Churches ==
Traces of three separate Norse church buildings have been found at Brattahlíð.

=== Thjodhild's church ===
The oldest of the three, and likely the first church in the Americas, is called Þjóðhildarkirkja (Thjodhild's church). The structure, more like a chapel than a full church, was discovered in 1961, when the community began construction of a school and uncovered a human skull. The skull was taken to the National Museum of Denmark, which prompted an archeological excavation at the site. The dig revealed a u-shaped building constructed of wooden walls with an insulating shell of turf on the exterior (the west end did not have the turf insulation, resulting in the u-shaped mound). The church's interior was approximately 2 metres (6.6 ft) by 3.5 metres (11 ft). Foundation stones, surrounding the building at a distance, suggest a small turf wall. In the area between the building and surrounding wall were discovered graves. This early churchyard contained the remains of 144 buried individuals, but contained no grave goods nor were any grave markers with identifying runes discovered.

In preparation for the millennial celebration of Leif Erikson's voyage to Vinland in 2000, a replica of Thjodhild's church was constructed at a distance from the actual site, along with a replica of a Norse longhouse.

=== Stone churches ===
Closer to the site of the main longhouse was a stone church, built in the 13th century on top of an even older stone church (both constructed after the Norse community had all converted to Christianity). It is possible the first stone church at this site was built by Leif Erikson's son, Thorkell, to replace his grandmother's small wooden and turf church.

Here archaeologists have found melted fragments of bell metal, and foundation stones of it and other buildings remained into the 20th century, as did the remnants of a possible forge. This church measured 12.5 m (41 ft) by 4.5 m (15 ft) and had two entrances, with what was evidently a hearth in the middle. Apparently, fire destroyed it. The churchyard has tombstones, with a cross cut on one of them. Engraved in runes on another stone is: "Ingibjørg's Grave". Stones mark the church's outline, although they were likely placed there in more recent years; visitors can also see the surrounding graveyard.

Brattahlíð map Norse-era ruins: 1 – Stone church, 2 – Dwelling, 3 – Storehouse, 4 – Sheepcote, 5 – Stable, 6 – Sheepcote, 7 – Stable or storehouse, 8 – Milking-fold, 9 – Storehouse, 10 – Thjodhild's church, 11 – Dwelling, 12 – Fence Modern features: A – Thjodhild's church (replica), B – Norse dwelling (replica)

== Farm ==
One farm building nearby measured 53 m (174 ft) by 14 m (46 ft), with stone walls about 1.5 m (4 ft 11 in) thick; a turf outer bank provided further insulation. Inside, it had a flagstone floor. Flat stones — or, in one case, the shoulder-blade of a whale — formed the stalls. Some of these buildings still stood in 1953, contemporaneous with the Bluie West One airfield at Narsarsuaq, but today they exist mostly as depressions in the ground.

Brattahlíð still has some of the best farmland in Greenland, owing to its location at the inner end of Eriksfjord, which protects it from the cold foggy weather and arctic waters of the outer coast. It has a youth hostel and a small store. More extensive facilities exist in Narsarsuaq across the fjord.

== Assembly ==
Brattahlíð hosted the first Greenlandic Þing (parliament), based on the Icelandic Althing. In the early 20th century through written sources and archeological evidence, scholars identified two potential Þing sites at Brattahlíð and at Garðar. Given the sparse nature of the Greenlandic settlement, it is reasonable that the participants of a Þing would have taken the opportunity for social interaction or trade.

The exact causes of the disappearance of the Norse settlements toward the end of the 15th century remain unverified, but probably resulted from a combination of the Little Ice Age's cooling temperatures, soil erosion, abandonment by Norway after the Black Plague and political turmoils, more convenient ways for Europeans to procure furs and a mercantile eclipsing by the Hanseatic League, and competition from the Inuit moving southward.

== See also ==
- Qassiarsuk, the present settlement on the location
- Garðar, a bishopric seat founded in the 12th century close to Brattahlíð
- An Old Captivity (1940) by Nevil Shute is a fictional account of an early aerial investigation of the old Norse settlement at 'Brattalid' and of Leif Ericson's journey to North America

== Bibliography ==
- Meldgaard, Jørgen (1982). "Tjodhildes Kirke – den første fundberetning" [Thjodhild's Church – The First Report of Discovery] (PDF). Tidsskriftet Grønland/The Journal Greenland (in Danish) (5). The Greenlandic Society/Det Grønlandske Selskab: 151–162.
- Diamond, Jared, Collapse: How Societies Choose to Fail or Succeed (New York: Viking, 2005) ISBN 0-670-03337-5
- Ingstad, Helge (tr. Naomi Walford), Land under the Pole Star (New York: St. Martin's, 1966)
- Jones, Gwyn, The Norse Atlantic Saga (Oxford University Press, 1986) ISBN 0-19-215886-4
