= Narsarsuaq =

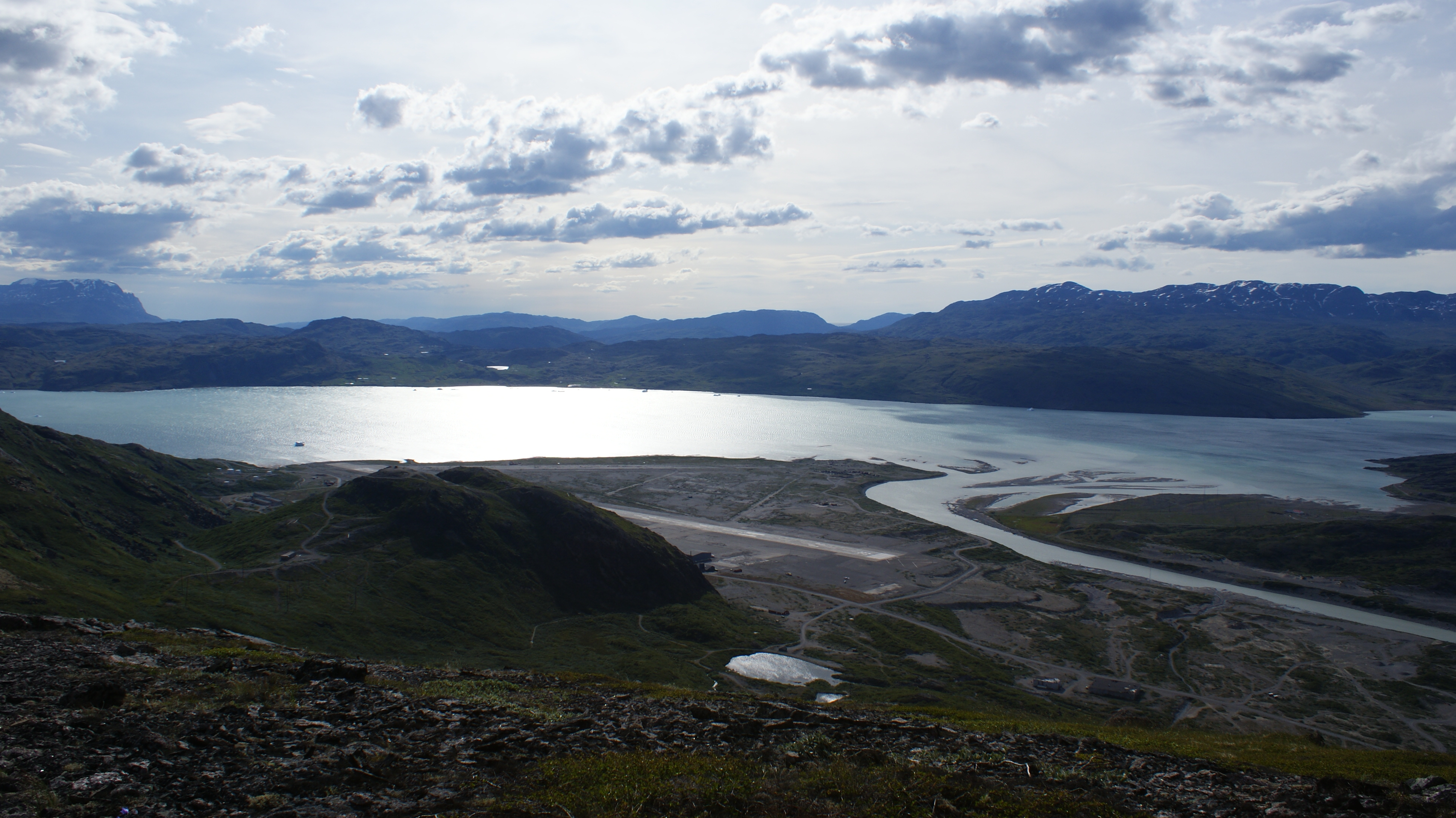
- Narsarsuaq and Tunulliarfik Fjord

- Location within Greenland
- Coordinates: 61°08′45″N 45°26′05″W
- State: Kingdom of Denmark
- Constituent country: Greenland
- Municipality: Kujalleq

Government
  - Mayor: Kiista P. Isaksen

Population (2020)
  - Total: 123
- Time zone: UTC−02:00 (Western Greenland Time)
  - Summer (DST): UTC−01:00 (Western Greenland Summer Time)
- Postal code: 3923

Narsarsuaq (lit. Great Plain; old spelling: Narssarssuaq) is a settlement in the Kujalleq municipality in southern Greenland. The settlement's economy and population of 123 inhabitants was almost entirely reliant on Narsarsuaq Airport, an old U.S. military base (Bluie West One). There is a tourism industry in and around Narsarsuaq, whose attractions include a great diversity of wildlife, gemstones and tours to glaciers. The closure of the airport in 2026 will mean that only 30 inhabitants will remain in the town.

== History ==
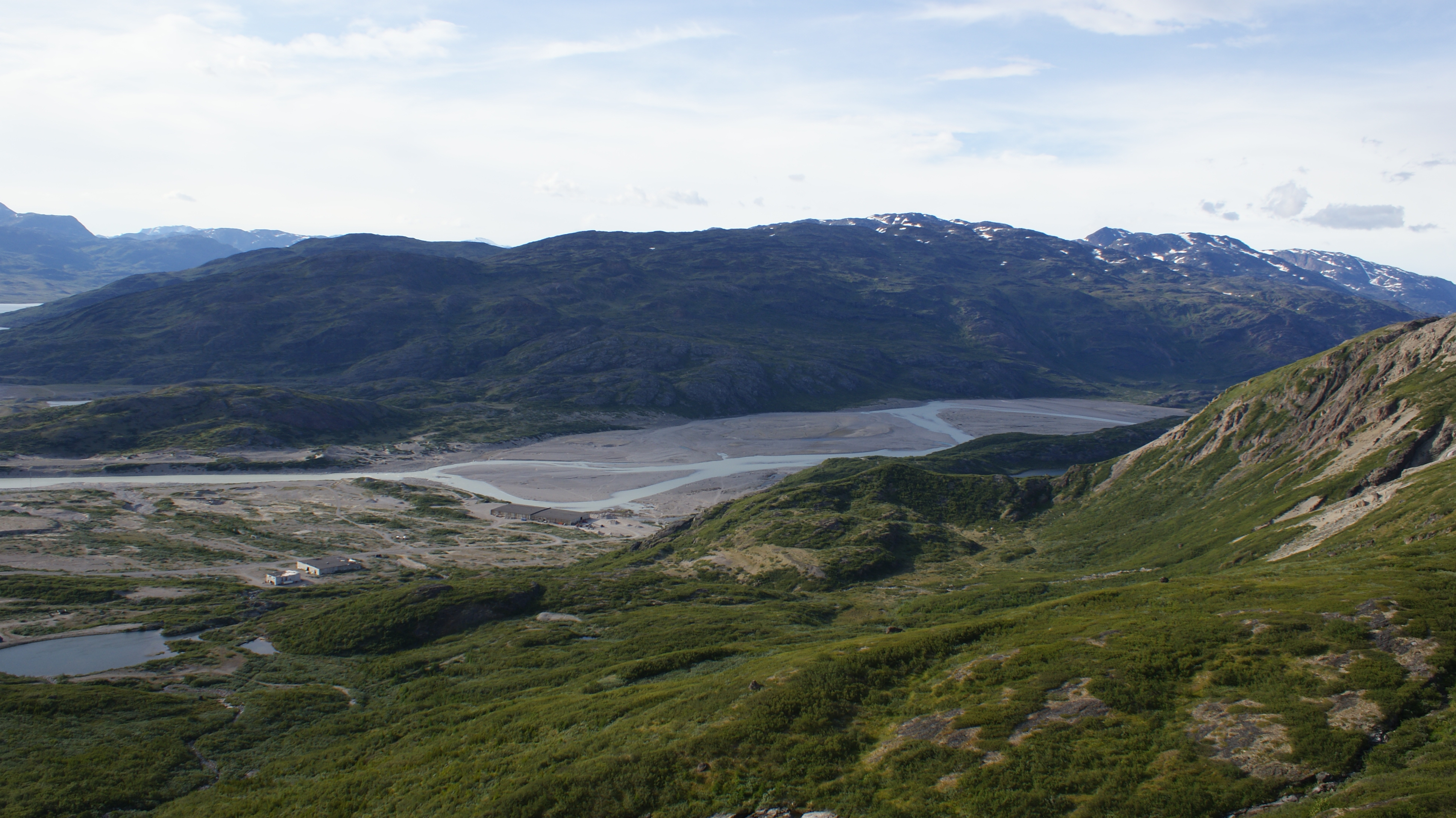
Narsarsuaq valley (Flower valley), seen from Mellemlandet

Narsarsuaq is located within the Eastern Settlement of the Greenlandic Norse; the Brattahlíð farm of Erik the Red established in 985 was located on the opposite bank of Tunulliarfik Fjord, where the modern settlement of Qassiarsuk is situated.

In 1941 the United States built an air base at Narsarsuaq code-named Bluie West One (BW1). (Bluie was the Allied military code name for Greenland.) Thousands of planes used BW1 as a stepping stone on their way from the aircraft factories in North America to the battlegrounds of Europe.

Old bunker from US use of Narsarsuaq as base during WW2

A 600-bed hospital was built in order to deal with casualties from the Normandy landings. After the end of the war, BW1 continued to be developed, and was a major hospital site during the Korean War, with the military hospital expanded to 1,000 beds. However, it was rendered surplus by the advent of mid-air refueling and the construction of the larger Thule Air Base in northern Greenland.

In 1951, it was agreed that Denmark and the United States would jointly oversee the airbase. Although it closed in 1958, it was reopened as Narsarsuaq Airport the following year by the Danish government after the loss of the vessel Hans Hedtoft and all crew south off Cape Farewell. The hospital was destroyed by a fire in 1972, although the ruins remain.

=== Post-war ===
The town and its airport remained an important part of Greenlandic aviation in the latter part of the 20th century, as one of two airports which were able to handle larger fixed-wing aircraft, the other being Kangerlussuaq Airport, also an old U.S. military base. It was the principal airfield in South Greenland, and served as a transfer point between fixed-wing flights and helicopters. A tourism industry developed as a result of the airport and most economic activities in the town are related to tourism or servicing the airport. Icelandair, SAS and later Air Greenland served the airport with international services to Keflavík, Iceland and Copenhagen since the 1950s, mostly during the summer.

The airport is also an important refuelling point for small planes crossing the Atlantic, which sometimes replicate the North Atlantic Ferry Route, stopping at Narsarsuaq Airport and other World War II airfields, including Goose Bay, Newfoundland in Canada and Reykjavík in Iceland.

=== Closure of airport ===
After decades of discussion, in 2018 a decision was made to construct an airport nearer to Qaqortoq, the largest town in South Greenland. The new airport eliminates the need for Narsarsuaq Airport as a domestic and Iceland-bound gateway to South Greenland. Qaqortoq Airport began operations in 2026.

In 2022, the Greenlandic government had decided that Narsarsuaq was to be downscaled to a heliport. The town would remain inhabited, though the scheduled closure of the airport had already begun affecting the town and there was uncertainty as to its future.

Air Greenland's seasonal route to Copenhagen ceased on 16 September 2025. Similarly, the last Icelandair flight to Reykjavík-Keflavík departed on 30 September 2025, as the summer season ended and will move its seasonal route to Qaqortoq Airport beginning in June 2026.

In October 2025, Greenland Airport announced layoffs at Narsarsuaq Airport, involving around 70 people, as it began to transition into a heliport. The Hotel Narsarsuaq ceased operating and the Narsarsuaq Museum also closed in conjunction with the airport closure. The closure of the airport in 2026 means that only 30 inhabitants will remain in the town.

Scheduled fixed-wing services were transferred to the newly-built Qaqortoq Airport on 16 April 2026 and Narsarsuaq Airport was subsequently downgraded to a heliport.

In mid-March 2026, Narsaruq was mentioned by General Guillot of United States Northern Command as one of three sites the Trump Administration intended to establish military bases On 22 September 2026, the United States, Denmark, and Greenland signed an agreement allowing the United States to establish a "Defense Area" at Narsarsuaq.

== Transport ==
Narsarsuaq Heliport is connected to Qaqortoq Airport by helicopter service. Narsarsuaq Airport previously served as the principal airfield in southwestern Greenland until flights were transferred to the newly-built Qaqortoq Airport in 2026.

Narsarsuaq has a sea port where passenger boats and cruise ships can moor. It is located 2.4 kilometres (1.5 mi) south of the heliport terminal building.

A 26 kilometres (16 mi) gravel road is maintained between Qassiarsuk and Narsarsuaq around the fjord. It has two river crossings without bridges but off-road vehicles ford them, although a direct boat across the fjord is also used. There is also a regular boat service to Qaqortoq, 85 kilometres (53 mi; 46 nmi), which takes almost 4 hours.

== Population ==
The population of the settlement is strictly tied to the traffic dynamics at the local airport.

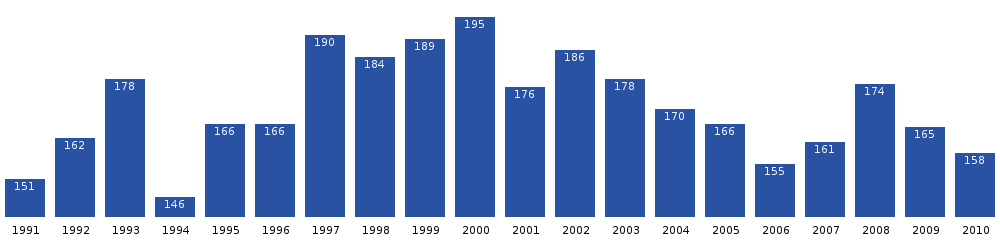
Narsarsuaq population dynamics in the last two decades. Source: Statistics Greenland

== Climate ==
Narsarsuaq experiences boundary subarctic climate (Köppen: Dfc), which with a 1.1 °C (1.98 °F) margin escapes being classified as polar climate that is typical for the rest of Greenland. Mean temperatures are similar to Vadsø in northeasternmost Norway. Despite its rather chilly temperatures, Narsarsuaq is one of the few places in Greenland with abundant naturally growing trees. This is due to several factors. Its geographical position is extremely sheltered from harsh subpolar winds by multiple layers of tall mountains to the west, and there is a heavy oceanic influence that results in a rather stable and steady amount of precipitation year-round. The oceanic influence can be observed in the occasional Atlantic storms that often pound the region (resulting in a fairly wet climate) and a moderate amount of precipitation per year (which could also be considered quite high by Greenlandic standards). Due to the fair climatic conditions, Narsarsuaq is the site of Greenland's only botanical garden, the "Greenlandic Arboretum".

Climate data for Narsarsuaq, Greenland (1991–2020, extremes 1941–present)
Month	Jan	Feb	Mar	Apr	May	Jun	Jul	Aug	Sep	Oct	Nov	Dec	Year
Record high °C (°F)	14.2 (57.6)	15.3 (59.5)	16.5 (61.7)	19.1 (66.4)	24.8 (76.6)	25.2 (77.4)	24.1 (75.4)	23.6 (74.5)	22.4 (72.3)	18.7 (65.7)	18.4 (65.1)	15.9 (60.6)	25.2 (77.4)
Mean daily maximum °C (°F)	−2.1 (28.2)	−2.6 (27.3)	−0.7 (30.7)	4.9 (40.8)	10.0 (50.0)	14.0 (57.2)	15.7 (60.3)	14.1 (57.4)	9.9 (49.8)	5.1 (41.2)	0.4 (32.7)	−1.6 (29.1)	5.6 (42.1)
Daily mean °C (°F)	−6.1 (21.0)	−6.5 (20.3)	−4.7 (23.5)	1.3 (34.3)	5.9 (42.6)	9.6 (49.3)	11.1 (52.0)	9.8 (49.6)	6.1 (43.0)	1.5 (34.7)	−3.3 (26.1)	−5.5 (22.1)	1.6 (34.9)
Mean daily minimum °C (°F)	−10.5 (13.1)	−11.1 (12.0)	−9.1 (15.6)	−2.6 (27.3)	1.6 (34.9)	5.1 (41.2)	6.7 (44.1)	5.8 (42.4)	2.3 (36.1)	−2.0 (28.4)	−7.3 (18.9)	−9.8 (14.4)	−2.6 (27.4)
Record low °C (°F)	−39.7 (−39.5)	−33.7 (−28.7)	−31.9 (−25.4)	−23.1 (−9.6)	−16.7 (1.9)	−2.9 (26.8)	0.1 (32.2)	−0.1 (31.8)	−5.7 (21.7)	−17.8 (0.0)	−26.1 (−15.0)	−35.9 (−32.6)	−39.7 (−39.5)
Average precipitation mm (inches)	40.0 (1.57)	52.3 (2.06)	37.1 (1.46)	44.7 (1.76)	32.8 (1.29)	44.8 (1.76)	49.8 (1.96)	66.3 (2.61)	80.2 (3.16)	56.7 (2.23)	68.2 (2.69)	39.5 (1.56)	612.4 (24.11)
Average precipitation days (≥ 0.1 mm)	10.0	8.2	9.5	10.4	8.8	11.1	12.5	10.6	11.2	9.8	9.6	10.1	122.0
Average snowy days	9.3	7.6	8.6	7.6	2.7	0.5	0.0	0.1	1.3	5.5	7.6	8.9	59.8
Average relative humidity (%)	65	64	66	65	65	69	74	72	69	67	66	65	67
Mean monthly sunshine hours	26	65	137	168	177	182	192	156	136	94	44	18	1,431
Source 1: Danish Meteorological Institute (precipitation days and snowy days 1961–1990 and sunshine 1980–1999)
Source 2: Météo Climat (records), NOAA (humidity 1961–1990)

== Greenlandic Arboretum ==
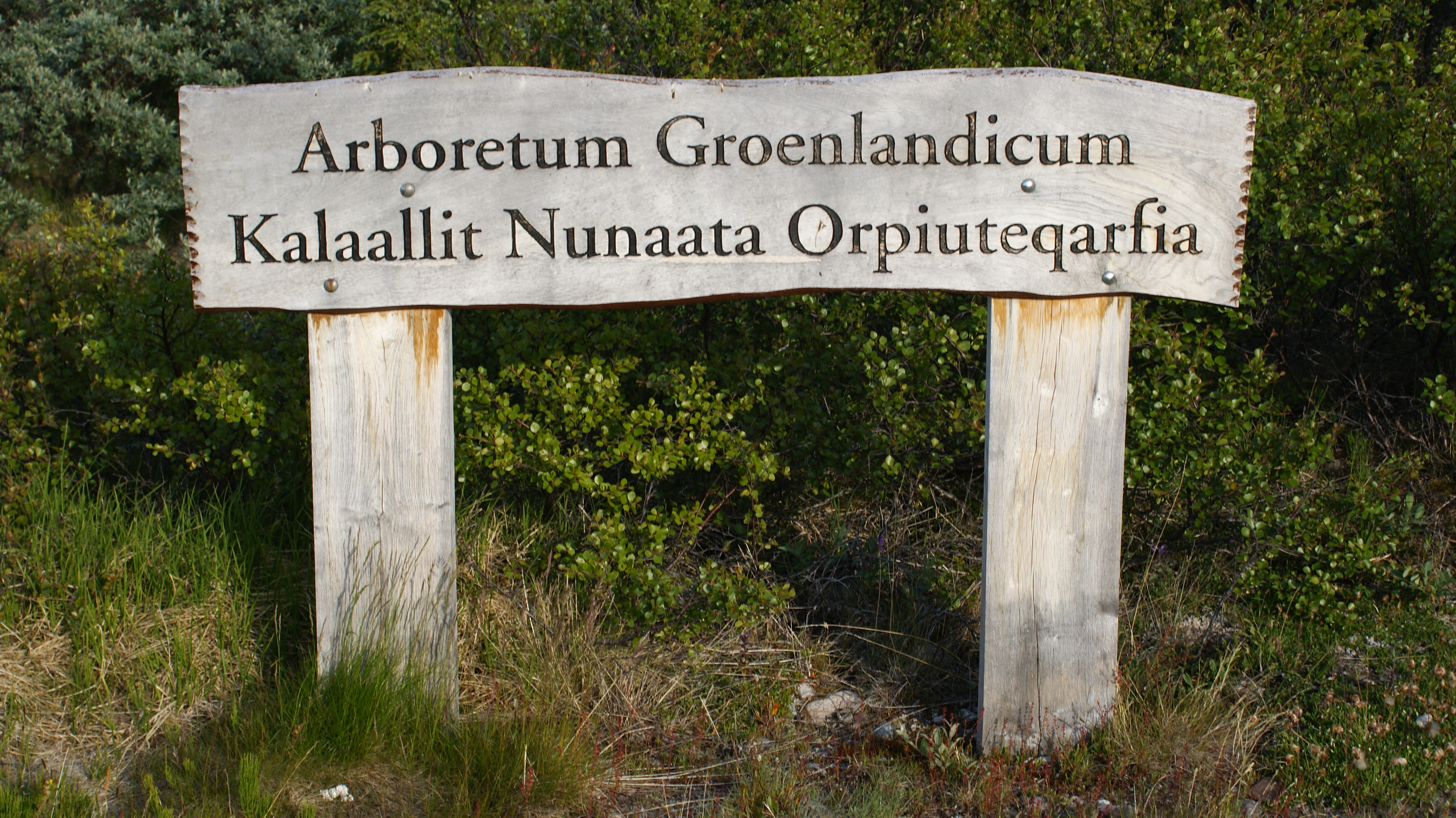
Arboretum Groenlandicum

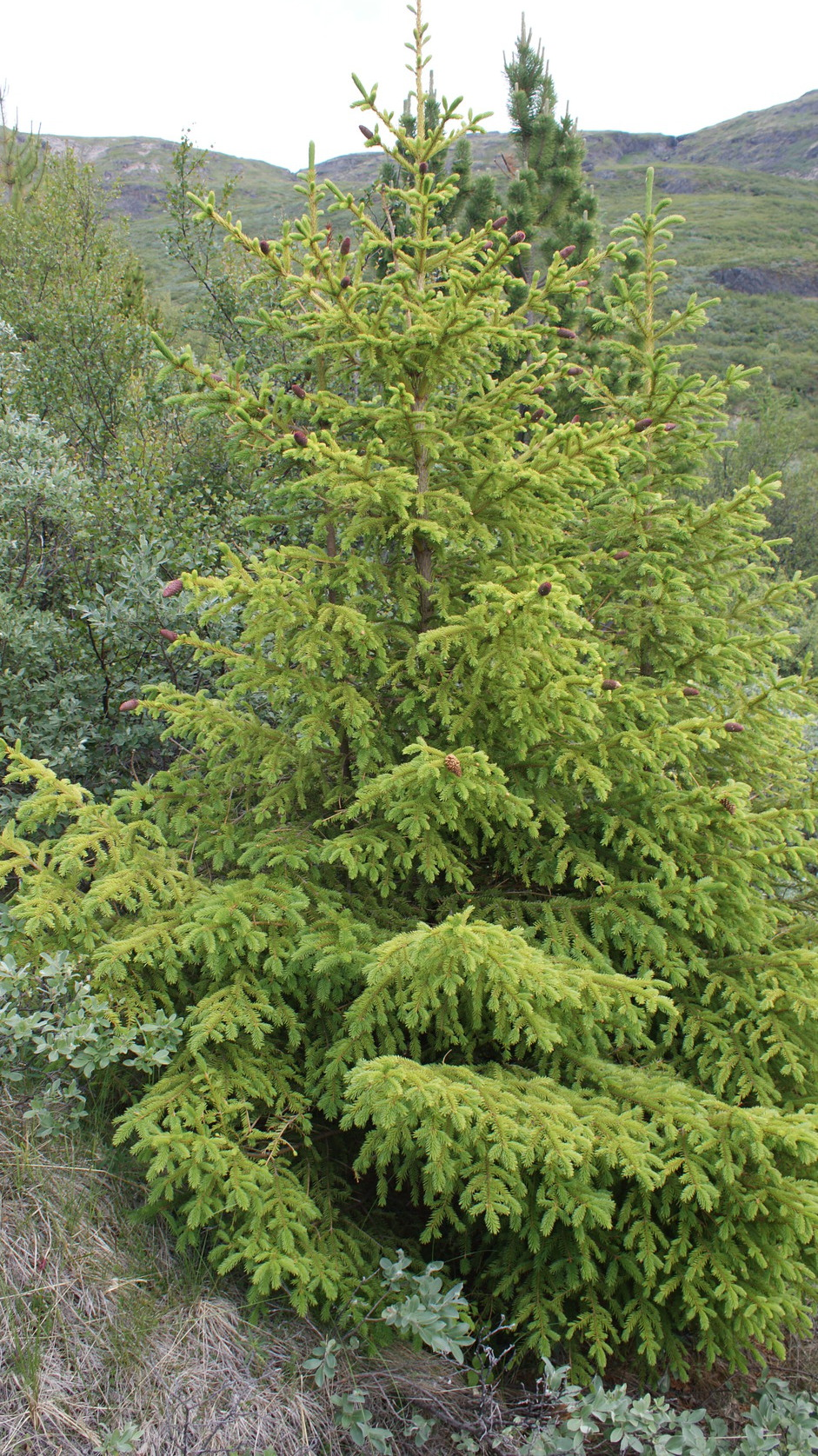
Trees of Greenland

On the lower slopes of the Mellemlandet ridge, close to Narsarsuaq Airport, there is a unique 'botanical garden of the Arctic', called the Greenlandic Arboretum. The goal is to establish a live collection of trees and bushes native to both the arctic and the alpine tree-lines of the entire Northern Hemisphere.

Founded in 1988, it encompasses 150 hectares and it shelters 120 plant species, mostly varieties of boreal taiga trees, such as Siberian larch, lodgepole pine, white spruce, Sitka spruce, and various bushes. There have also been plantings of a few species, including sycamore maple and American chestnut, from middle latitudes south of the boreal zone. Many individual trees are tagged or otherwise marked. The plantation currently has more than 100,000 trees of various provenances.
