= Eastern Settlement =

Area of Norse Greenland

Coordinates: 61°00′N 45°25′W

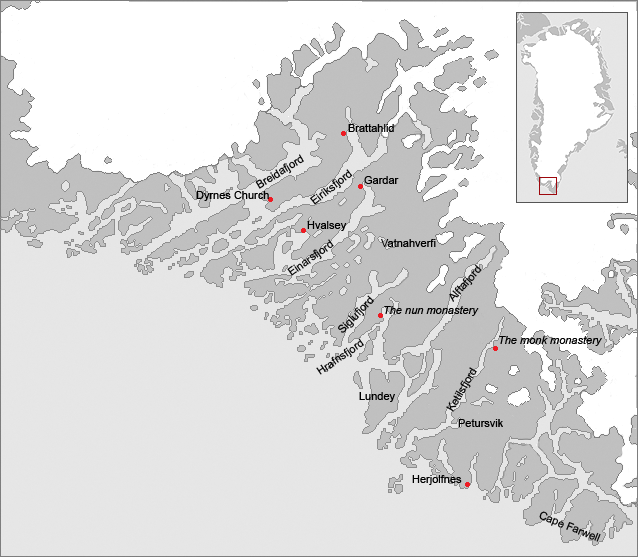
Map of the eastern Norse settlement in medieval Greenland. The area is within the current municipality of Kujalleq. The known major farms and churches are identified, as well as some probable geographical names.

The Eastern Settlement (Old Norse: Eystribygð [ˈœystreˌbyɣð]) was the first and by far the larger of the two main areas of Norse Greenland, settled c. AD 985 – c. AD 1000 by Norsemen from Iceland. At its peak, it contained approximately 4,000 inhabitants. The last written record from the Eastern Settlement is of a wedding in Hvalsey in 1408, placing it about 50–100 years later than the end of the more northerly Western Settlement.

Despite its name, the Eastern Settlement was more south than east of its companion and, like the Western Settlement, was located on the southwestern tip of Greenland at the head of long fjords such as Tunulliarfik Fjord or Eiriksfjord, Igaliku or Einarsfjord, and Sermilik Fjord. Approximately 500 groups of ruins of Norse farms are found in the area, with 16 church ruins, including Brattahlíð, Dyrnæs, Garðar, Hvalsey and Herjolfsnes. The Vatnahverfi district to the southeast of Einarsfjord had some of the best pastoral land in the colony, and boasted 10% of all the known farm sites in the Eastern Settlement.

The economy of the medieval Norse settlements was based on livestock farming – mainly sheep and cattle, with some seal hunting. The Little Ice Age in the 14th century may have increased the demand for winter fodder and at the same time decreased productivity of hay meadows. Isotope analysis of bones excavated at archaeological investigations in the Norse settlements has found that fishing played an increasing role towards the end of the settlement's life. While the diet of the first settlers consisted of 80% agricultural products and 20% marine food, from the 14th century the Greenland Norsemen had 50–80% of their diet from the sea.

In the Greenlandic Inuit oral tradition, there is a legend about why the Norse population of Hvalsey died out and why their houses and churches are in ruins. According to the legend, the reason was a blood feud between local Norse chieftain Ungortoq and a young but determined Inuk warrior named K'aissape. In revenge for Ungortoq's slaying of his younger brother, Inuit warriors under K'aissape approached Hvalsey by sea while disguised as an iceberg and then burned down the Norse settlers inside their houses, but Ungortoq escaped with his family. K'aissape finally hunted down and slew Ungortoq and his whole family near Cape Farewell. According to archaeological studies, there is no sign of a conflagration. Other explanations have also been offered, including soil erosion due to overgrazing and the effects of the Black Death.

Major parts of the Eastern Settlement, including Brattahlíð, the homestead of Erik the Red, were included on the UNESCO World Heritage List in 2017 as Kujataa Greenland: Norse and Inuit Farming at the Edge of the Ice Cap.

== See also ==
- Norse settlements in Greenland
- History of Greenland
- Norse colonization of the Americas
- Ivittuut, the site of a smaller "Middle Settlement"
- Danish colonization of the Americas
