= Herjolfsfjord =

Fjord in Greenland

Coordinates: 60.037°N 44.699°W

Herjolfsfjord was the Norse name of a fjord in Greenland where one of their major homesteads was located. The fjord is approximately 50 km northwest of Cape Farewell and is now called Narssap Sarqa.

== Norse period ==
The name Herjolfsfjord was in honour of Herjolf Bardsson, one of the founding chieftains of the Icelandic Norse colony in Greenland established circa 985 AD, as recounted in the Greenlanders Saga and The Landnámabók. Herjolf's homestead, Herjolfsnes, was located on the western shoreline of the fjord's end, facing the open ocean. The other chieftains favoured the heads of fjords, inland and away from the ocean, where farming conditions were better, which suggests that Herjolf was more interested in establishing a port-of-call than farming. Herjolfsfjord was the southern- and easternmost extent of major Norse homesteading in Greenland. Archeologists have identified 8 other smaller Norse sites on the fjord, about half on each side.

== Modern period ==
The modern Greenlandic name of the fjord is Narssap Sarqa, with the northwest fork called Amitsuarssuk. It features one community, Narsarmijit (sometimes appearing on maps as Narsaq Kujalleq and formerly Frederiksdal), located on the eastern shoreline about 3 km across the fjord from the ruins of the old Herjolfsnes homestead. The Herjolfsnes site later became known by Inuit Greenlanders as Ikigait, but is now uninhabited.

== Details ==
The fjord is approximately 16 km long, about two-thirds of which extends north from the ocean end (59.986577, -44.692687) up to a fork, then turning northwest further inland for approximately 5 km, to the fjord's head (60.125168, -44.754610).
