= Sandnæs =

Norse settlement in Greenland

Coordinates: 64°14′37″N 50°10′32″W

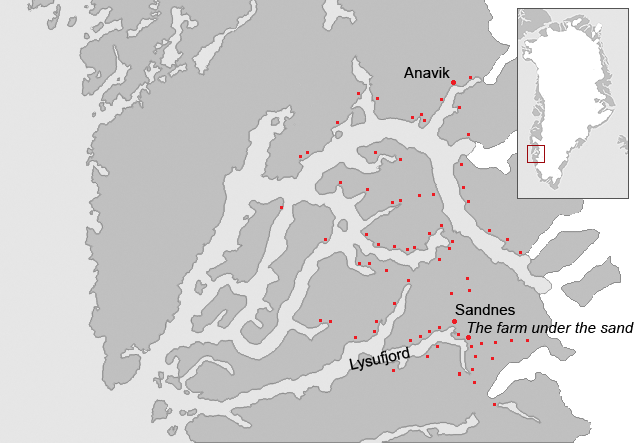
Location of Sandnæs in the Western Settlement, Greenland

Sandnæs, often anglicized as Sandnes, was the largest Norse farmstead in the Western Settlement of medieval Greenland. Similarly with the Norwegian city of Sandnes, its name meant "Sandy Headland" in Old Norse. It was settled around AD 1000 and abandoned by the late 14th century. It was located at the site known as Kilaarsarfik today, at the head of the Ameralla Fjord south of modern Nuuk's peninsula.

The farm was well-placed and possessed a large pasturage enabling its proprietors to successfully raise cattle, compared with goats and sheep at the other Western Settlement farms. It also included the area's church. However, the conditions throughout the site's existence were apparently filthy.

The site has been excavated, proving among other things that the Vikings continued to trade with the American mainland after Leif Ericson's failed colonization attempt. An arrowhead likely from the Point Revenge culture of Native Americans in Labrador has been found in the graveyard at Sandnæs. There is also evidence of iron extraction at the site.
