= Ikigait =

Former community in Greenland

Coordinates: 59°59′N 44°42′W

Location within Greenland

Ikigait (Danish: Herjulfsnæs) is a former community in Greenland about 3 km west of Narsarmijit. It was the site of Herjólfr Bárðarson's farm Herjolfsnes ("Herjolf's Point"), one of the easternmost of the Norse settlements during their colonization of Greenland.

The location was established around 1885, when a few artifacts were discovered and returned to Denmark. In 1921, an excavation was led by Danish historian and archaeologist Poul Nørlund (1888-1951), which found the church graveyard.
