= Bjarni Herjólfsson =

Icelandic explorer who saw North America in 986

Bjarni Herjólfsson (fl. 10th century) was an Icelandic explorer who is believed to be the first known European discoverer of the mainland of the Americas, which he sighted in 986.

== Life ==
Bjarni was born in Iceland to Herjólfr, son of Bárdi Herjólfsson (Old Norse: Bárði), and Thorgerdr (Old Norse: Þorgerðr). In adulthood, Bjarni became a merchant captain, based in Norway, but visiting his father every summer in Iceland.

=== Sighting of the American coastline ===
Bjarni is believed to have been the first European to see North America. The Grœnlendinga saga (Greenlanders Saga) tells that one year he sailed to Iceland to visit his parents as usual, only to find that his father had gone with Erik the Red to Greenland. So he took his crew and set off to find him. But in that summer of 986, Bjarni, who had no map or compass, was blown off course by a storm. He saw a piece of land that was not Greenland. It was covered with trees and mountains and although his crew begged him to, he refused to stop and look around. Since no one in his crew had been to Greenland before, they had to search for it. Although he managed to regain his course, he reported seeing low-lying hills covered with forests some distance farther to the west. The land looked hospitable, but Bjarni was eager to reach Greenland to see his parents and did not land and explore the new lands. Eventually arriving in Greenland, he decided to settle with his father in Herjolfsnes. He reported his findings in Greenland but no one showed much interest in them until Bjarni returned to Norway after his father's death.

== Legacy ==
After his voyage, word spread of the lands to the west he had seen, creating great intrigue throughout the Nordic Empire. Bjarni was both celebrated for his discoveries and chided—famously by Earl Eric—for his lack of investigation. Professor Tryggvi J. Oleson of the University of Manitoba stated "There are strong arguments for the view that the three lands seen by Bjarni were Newfoundland, Labrador, and Baffin Island."

Greenlanders took special interest in his discoveries, and, as they lacked timber, became allured by the wooded coastline Bjarni reported sighting. Soon afterwards, Leif Erikson (Old Norse: Leifr Eiríksson), the son of Greenland leader Erik the Red, bought the ship that Bjarni had used for the voyage, hired a crew of 35 people, and set out to retrace Bjarni's journey. The result is thought to be the Viking settlement at L'Anse aux Meadows in Newfoundland. This is the first known attempt at settlement by Europeans on the Americas.

== In fiction ==
The main character, also named Bjarni, in the Cultures video game series is based on Herjólfsson.

The main character, Barney Hendrickson, of The Technicolor Time Machine realizes that he is Bjarni, his name having undergone some alterations to become more typical Norse over the generations.

In the Clive Cussler book, Eye of Heaven, it is noted that Leif Ericsson journeyed westward after hearing of the new world from Bjarni Herjólfsson, when he sailed off course in A.D.986.

== Related reading ==
- Oleson, Tryggvi J., The Norsemen in America (Ottawa: Canadian Historical Association, 1963) (CHA Historical Booklet No. 14).
- Oleson, Tryggvi J., Early Voyages and Northern Approaches 1000-1632, Volume 1 of the Canadian Centenary Series (Toronto: McClelland & Stewart, 1963; re-issue with additional material, 1968).
