= Ívar Bárðarson =

Norwegian catholic priest

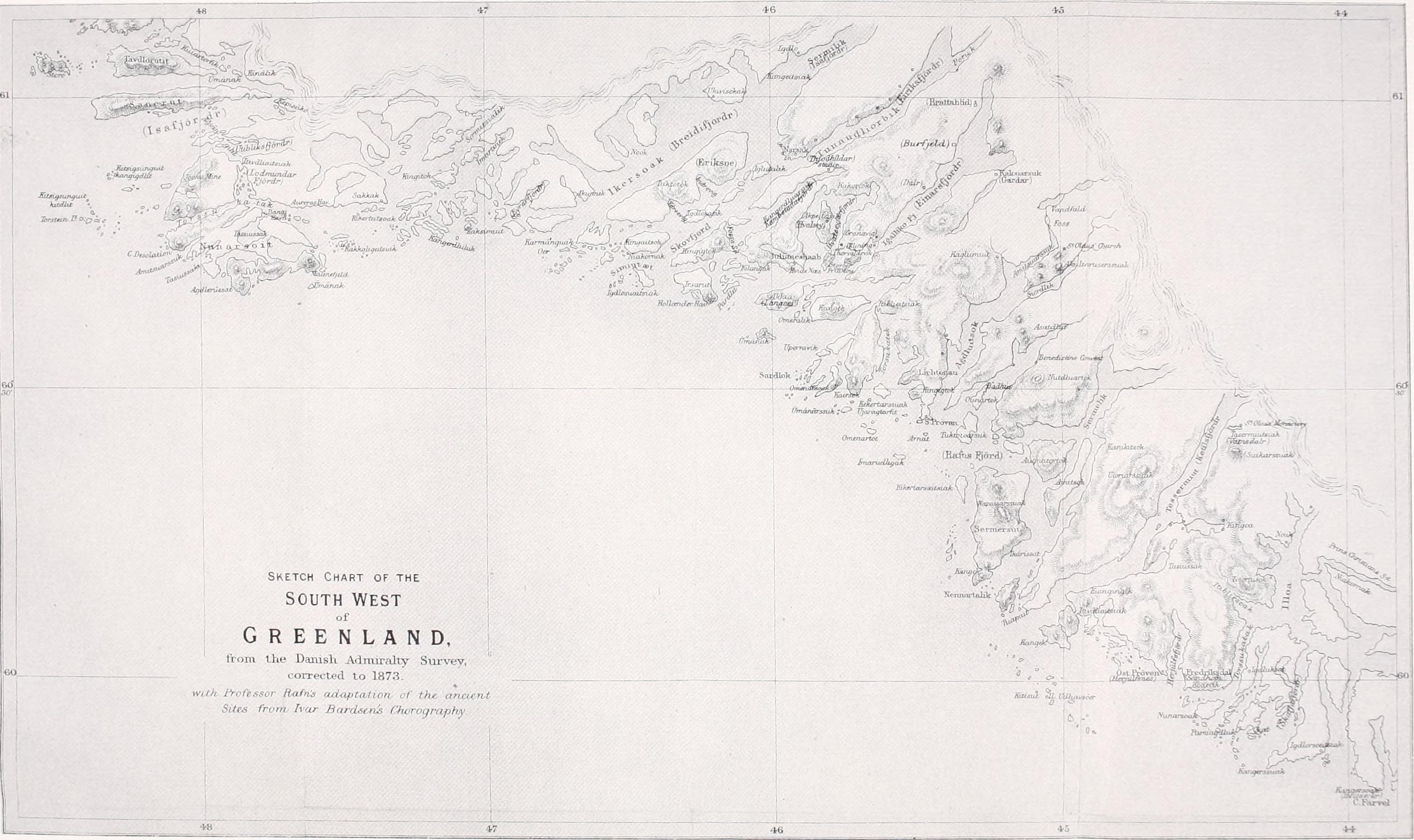
A map of locations from Ívar Bárðarson's report on Greenland, Det gamle Grønlands beskrivelse

Ívar Bárðarson (also known as Ivar Bardarson (Note: Along with Ivar Bardarson and Ivar Bardsen, his name has been latinized as Ivarus Barderi, and sometimes abbreviated to Bertt or Bere.)) was a fourteenth-century Norwegian clergyman. After the death of the Gardar bishop, he became the Catholic Church's official representative in Greenland. He is known primarily for his reports on the medieval Norse colonies. The reports covered the Eastern Settlement, church property, daily life, and perilous sailing routes. On an expedition to the more remote Western Settlement, Bárðarson found the colony abandoned, inhabited only by feral livestock. No original written reports have survived, but a sixteenth-century Danish translation has been preserved. Despite possible errors or interpolations, it remains valuable to historians. The translation is one of the few primary sources for life in medieval Greenland. During the 1360s, he returned to Norway and was appointed canon of Bergen Cathedral.

== Life ==
Ívar Bárðarson was a Norwegian clergyman who was the Catholic Church's official representative in Greenland from 1341 to 1366. Little is known about his background or personal life. He is best known for his detailed first-hand account of the Eastern Settlement in Medieval Greenland. Bishop Hakon appointed Bárðarson an official representative of the Catholic Diocese of Bergen on 8 August 1341. His initial purpose in Greenland is unclear from historical records. Some historians believe that his goal was to register the Greenlandic churches for reorganization based on the detailed accounts that he wrote. At the time, the church owned about a third of the developed land in the colony. Bishop Árni served on the island at Garðar, Greenland, from 1315 until he died in 1347 or 1349. Until a new bishop was ordained, Bárðarson filled the vacancy at Garðar Cathedral as an official representative of the Catholic Church.

Bárðarson returned to Bergen, Norway, in the 1360s with information on Scandinavian Greenland. Over time, the colonists had grown increasingly isolated, and communications with the colony had greatly diminished. The Eastern Settlement had lost contact with the Western Settlement, which was being abandoned, and new sea ice was making the trip between Greenland and Iceland more perilous. He wrote that Gunnbjörn's skerries, a group of rocky islands along the eastern coast of Greenland, had once been the halfway point on voyages to the colonies, "but now ice has come down from the northeast out of the gulf of the sea so near to the aforesaid skerries, that no one without extreme peril can sail the old course, and be heard of again..." In 1364, he was appointed canon of Bergen Cathedral. There are no recorded details of his life past this point.

== Writing ==
Bárðarson's original written report has not survived. It was translated into Danish with annotations in the early sixteenth century as Det gamle Grønlands beskrivelse, (Note: Literally a "Description of Old Greenland", in English it is also referred to as "Ívar Bárðarson's Description of Greenland" and "The Description of Greenland according to Ívar Bárðarson".) most likely by Danish Bishop Erik Valkendorf, who intended to reestablish the church in Greenland. Several manuscript copies of this Danish translation still exist. The best-preserved is the 17th-century manuscript "AM 777 a 4to" in the collection Safn Árna Magnússonar at the Arnamagnæan Institute. An early English translation was done by Samuel Purchas in 1625.

There are several limitations to the Danish translation as a historical document. It may have been compiled from separate manuscripts by Ívar Bárðarson. It likely includes some interpolations, especially near the end, where exotic fruits are mentioned growing in Greenland. Nevertheless, it remains a significant primary source for historians, especially for the collapse of the Greenlandic Western Settlement. It is also one of only a handful of primary source documents covering interactions between the Precolumbian Norse explorers and Native Americans.

The report has four sections: sailing from Norway to Greenland, an overview of fjords and church property, a description of a trip to the Western Settlement, and the overall living conditions in Greenland. According to Bárðarson, the Western Settlement had disappeared as a colony by the 14th century. The Eastern Settlement had not heard from the more remote colony, and when Bárðarson sought out colonists in the north, he found only abandoned farms. He wrote of the place, "There are no people, neither Christian nor Heathen." Feral sheep, goats, and cows descended from the Greenland livestock wandered the area. Native Americans, called skrælingjar by the Greenlanders, were the only people living nearby. Later excavations at Gård Under Sandet (Farm Beneath the Sand) corroborated these observations. Inside an abandoned Norse home, archaeologists found one of the colony's last feral domesticated goats preserved in permafrost. The removal of furniture indicated that the residents had intentionally abandoned the farm, and the layer of feces on the floor showed that the goat had lived in the empty home until a wall collapsed onto it.
