= Western Settlement =

Farms in Greenland by Norsemen

Coordinates: 64°24′N 50°18′W

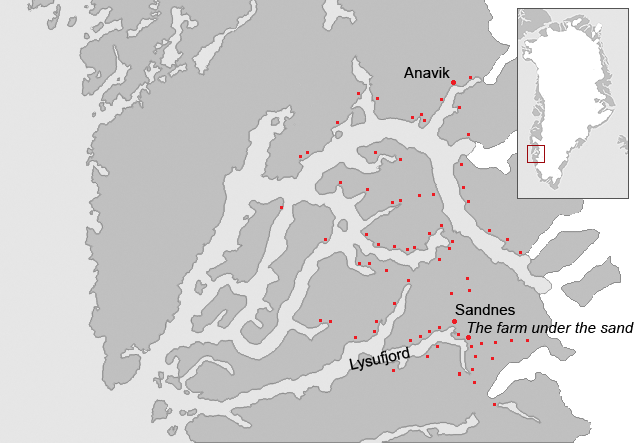
Map of the Western Settlement of the Norse in medieval Greenland, in the modern municipality of Sermersooq. The known farms (red dots) and churches are identified, as well as some probable geographical names. "The farm under the sand" is more commonly known as "GUS" from its Danish name "Gården under sandet".

The Western Settlement (Old Norse: Vestribygð [ˈwestreˌbyɣð]) was a group of farms and communities established by Norsemen from Iceland around 985 in medieval Greenland. Despite its name, the Western Settlement was more north than west of its companion Eastern Settlement and was located at the bottom of the deep Nuup Kangerlua fjord (inland from Nuuk, the modern-day Greenlandic capital).

Much less is known about the Western Settlement than the Eastern Settlement, as there is very little mention and no direct description of it in any of the medieval sources on Greenland. At its peak, the Western Settlement probably had about 1,000 inhabitants, about a quarter of the size of the Eastern Settlement, owing to its shorter growing season. The largest of the Western Settlement farms was Sandnæs. Ruins of almost 95 farms have been found in the area.

The Western Settlement was last mentioned by Ivar Bardarson (Ivar Bårdsson), a Norwegian cleric who was sent to Greenland in 1341 to serve as superintendent of the bishop's seat at Gardar in the Eastern Settlement. After the death of Bishop Árni in 1347 or 1348, Greenland was without a bishop until Bishop Álfur was ordained in 1365 and arrived in 1368. Ivar Bardsson served as principal of the diocese during the interim period. In his voyage to the Western Settlement, he found only vacant farms. He subsequently wrote to the bishop of Bergen to describe conditions he observed. By 1360 he had returned to Bergen to serve as a canon of Bergen Cathedral.

The demise of the Western Settlement coincides with a decrease in temperatures commonly known as the Little Ice Age. A study of North Atlantic seasonal temperature variability showed a significant decrease in maximum summer temperatures beginning in the late 13th century to early 14th century—as much as 6–8 °C lower than modern summer temperatures. The study also found that the lowest winter temperatures of the last 2000 years occurred in the late 14th century and early 15th century.

Archaeoentomologists dated domestic insects in the permafrost around GUS. These insects died out when the Norse abandoned the colony. The study also examined the insects' diet to determine the conditions at the end of the colony's existence. After a very poor growing season, the final colonists began consuming their dogs and livestock and were likely near starvation during the winter. The colonists likely abandoned the last farms around 1360 AD.

== See also ==
- Norse settlements in Greenland
- Middle Settlement
- Danish colonization of Greenland

== Other sources ==
- Diamond, Jared (2012) Norse Greenland: A Controlled Experiment in Collapse--A Selection from Collapse (Penguin) ISBN 9781101629352
- Jones, Gwyn (1964) The Norse Atlantic Saga: Being the Norse Voyages of Discovery and Settlement to Iceland, Greenland, America(London: Oxford University Press) ISBN 978-0192851604
- Lamb, Hubert H.(1995) Climate, History and the Modern World (London: Routledge) ISBN 978-0415127356
- Mowat, Farley (1965) Westviking: The Ancient Norse in Greenland and North America (Boston: Little, Brown) ISBN 978-0771065798
- Seaver, Kirsten A. (1996) The Frozen Echo: Greenland and the Exploration of North America, Ca. A.D. 1000-1500 (Stanford University Press) ISBN 9780804731614
