= Norse settlements in Greenland =

Abandoned Middle Age Norse settlements

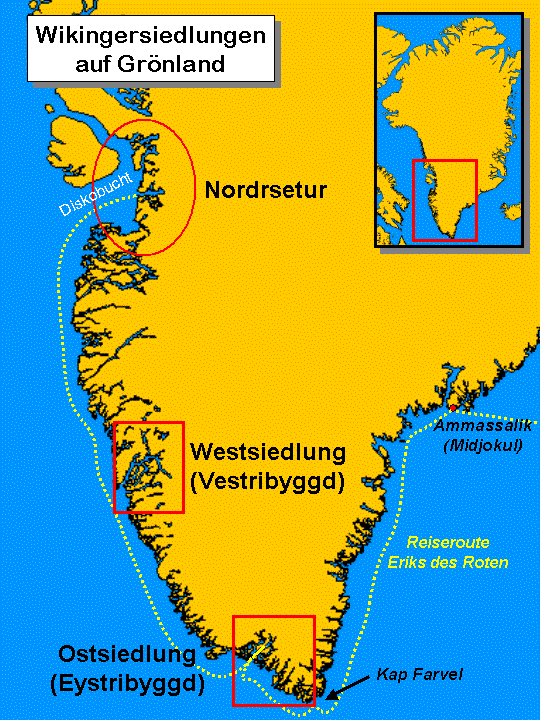
Icelandic settlements in Greenland

Norse settlements in Greenland were established after 986 CE by settlers coming from Iceland. The settlers, known as Grænlendingar ('Greenlanders' in Icelandic and not to be confused with modern Greenlanders), were the first Europeans to explore and temporarily settle North America. They appear to have developed their own dialect of Old Norse, now called Greenlandic Norse, not to be confused with the Eskaleut Greenlandic language. The Thule people, ancestors of modern Greenlandic Inuit, began migrating into Greenland around 1200 CE, bringing advanced Arctic maritime technologies that allowed them to thrive in the environment and eventually becoming the dominant population by 1300 CE. The Norse settlements existed for about half a millennium before they were abandoned for reasons that are still not entirely clear.

Despite their disappearance, Denmark–Norway, apparently believing the Norse settlements had still survived, continued to claim sovereignty over Greenland despite the lack of contact with the Norse. In 1721, Denmark–Norway sent a missionary expedition to Greenland, with the intent to reinstate Christianity among descendants of the Norse settlers; however, no Norse were found, and the missionaries instead baptized the Inuit inhabitants.

== Historical record ==
The sources on the settlement of Greenland are sparse. The main sources are the Íslendingabók by the scholar Ari Thorgilsson, the Landnámabók (the land seizure book) by an unknown author, but probably written with Ari's involvement, (Note: Both German in Islands Besiedlung und älteste Geschichte.) the anonymous Grænlendinga saga (Saga of the Greenlanders) and the also anonymous Saga of Erik the Red. But there is also information about the inhabitants of Greenland in other works; these are: the Flóamanna saga (Story of the People of Flói), the Einars þáttr Sokkasonar (Story of Einar Sokkason), the Króka-Refs saga (Story of Fox the Cunning), a more novelistic tale from the 14th century, the Fóstbrœðra saga (The Story of the Oath Brothers), (Note: German version in Grönländer und Färinger Geschichten.) the story of Olaf Tryggvason in the Heimskringla, the Konungs skuggsjá, and Adam of Bremen.

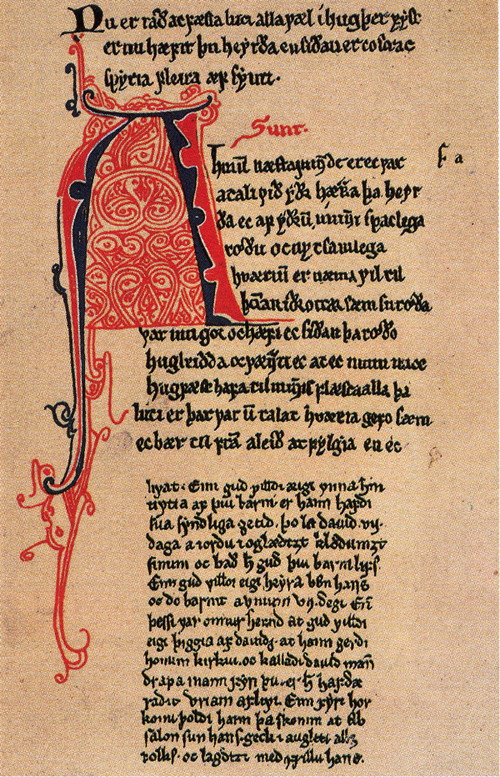
The Konungs skuggsjá from approximately 1250 contains a great deal of information about the natural resource base of the Norse settlement on Greenland

Individual messages can also be found in the Icelandic annals, which are reproduced in translation below. Geographical notes about Greenland (Gripla, Landabók and others) remain unmentioned here. Three Inuit stories about the Norsemen have been passed down in oral tradition. They were recorded in the 19th century and published by Hinrich Johannes Rink under the title Eskimoiske Eventyr og Sagn in Copenhagen 1866–1871. Even though these stories are very legendary and fairytale-like, they still represent the only evidence of the memory of Inuit on this topic. From the 14th century, the most important source is the description of Greenland by Ívarr Bárðarson, who stayed there for several years. The Skarðárannáll by Björn Jónsson á Skarðsá also enjoys a high reputation, although some dating errors can be found in later additions. Written sources can be confusing, for example, it is not possible to determine whether a date is 1406, 1456 or 1460.

There are no sources written in Greenland itself. There is no Greenlandic collection of laws, no chronicles, no annals of any kind. This absence is particularly noticeable after 1300, when few sagas were written, and accounts of earlier events are unreliable.

Original documents have varying credibility. Adam praises the Danish king Sven Estridson for his scholarship and confesses that he learned many important facts for his book, but his description of Greenlanders, whom he describes as "pale green like the sea," from which Greenland gets its name, is obviously fabulous. The news found in Rimbert's Vita Ansgarii that Pope Gregory IV had also appointed Ansgar of Bremen legate for Greenland and that Pope Nicholas I had commissioned him to proselytize in Greenland, is considered a later, false insertion. However, Adam's news that Archbishop Adalbert had ordained the first bishop Ísleifur Gissurarson for Iceland and also for Greenland is sound. Some accounts are derivative because they have been obviously taken from other sources. Other texts are obviously fictitious, but their embedding in Greenlandic society can accurately reflect the conditions there as a background.

Ari Thorgilsson writes in his Íslendingabók that he got his information from his uncle, who had a good memory and who spoke to someone in Greenland who had sailed to Greenland with Erik the Red.

Archaeology has now produced results that can be used to check individual reports.

== Discovery of Greenland ==
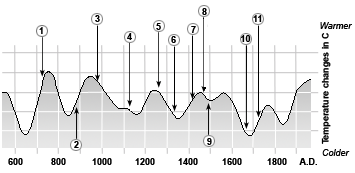
A graphical description of changes in temperature in Greenland from 500 – 1990 based on analysis of the deep ice core from Greenland and some historical events. The annual temperature changes are shown vertical in ˚C. The numbers are to be read horizontally: 1. From 700 to 750 people belonging to the Late Dorset culture move into the area around Smith Sound, Ellesmere Island and Greenland north of Qaanaaq (Thule).; 2. Norse settlement of Iceland starts in the second half of the 9th century.; 3. Norse settlement of Greenland starts just before 1000.; 4. Thule Inuit move into northern Greenland in the 12th century.; 5. Late Dorset culture disappears from Greenland in the second half of the 13th century.; 6. The Western Settlement disappears in mid 14th century.; 7. In 1408 is the Marriage in Hvalsey, the last known written document on the Norse in Greenland.; 8. The Eastern Settlement disappears in the mid-15th century.; 9. John Cabot is the first European in the post-Iceland era to visit Labrador – Newfoundland in 1497.; 10. "Little Ice Age" from c. 1600 to mid 18th century.; 11. The Norwegian priest Hans Egede arrives in Greenland in 1721.

The Viking expansion in the Early Middle Ages had its roots in two main social characteristics. The inheritance law in force among the Nordic peoples at the time favoured the firstborn son. When new arable and pastureland in Scandinavia could no longer be developed due to the relatively dense settlement, the only alternative left to those born later was to build up their own property outside the established structures. This was promoted by the high value that personal daring, willingness to take risks and physical resilience had in the local society. With advances in shipbuilding around the 8th century, the tools became available to travel to the edge of the known world and found settlements there.

The springboard for the settlement of Greenland was the settlement of Iceland. According to current estimates, 50,000 to 60,000 people lived in Iceland in the 10th century. A stable social structure had been established and good land was in legally secure ownership. This stable distribution of land, several years of bad harvests and a famine provided the setting to look for new settlement areas in the 970s.

Around 900, the seafarer Gunnbjörn Ulfsson was on a voyage from Norway to Iceland and his ship drifted towards a western coast, probably in the area of today's Cape Farewell (Cape Farvel) on the southern tip of Greenland. He had sighted icebergs, skerries and a desolate, inhumane landscape and therefore did not go ashore.

Erik the Red acquired the Haukadalr farm on the Icelandic Breiðafjörður (Breidafjord; near today's Búðardalur in northwest Iceland) through marriage. The Althing sent him into exile for three years for having committed murder. The Landnámabók reports that in 982 he sailed west from the Snæfellsnes peninsula with the outlaws Þorbjörn (Thorbjörn), Eyjólfr (Eyjolf) and Styrr (Styr) to find Gunnbjörn Ulfsson's land. He reached the Greenland coast at "Miðjökull" (Midjökul; probably today's Amassalik in East Greenland), then sailed south and rounded Cape Farvel to find suitable land for settlement. He spent his first winter on an island off the south coast. According to the Íslendingabók, he found traces of settlement there, which probably came from the Neo-Thule culture (skrælingjar).

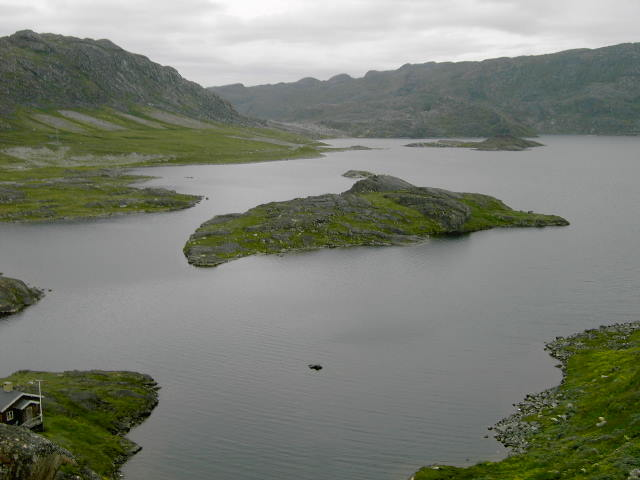
Eiriksfjord

The following spring, Erik sailed further north and entered a large fjord that was named Eiriksfjord (Eriksfjord, and now Tunulliarfik Fjord) after him. At the end of the fjord, at a latitude of around 61°, he founded his farm Brattahlíð (Brattahlid) in the most climatically favourable area of Greenland. First he built a rectangular wooden hall. From there he undertook several exploratory trips that took him beyond the Arctic Circle to what is now Disko Bay. The following year he sailed back to Iceland.

He managed to win over approximately 700 people by convincing them that they would find lush pastures and the best conditions for settlement in "Green land", as he called the newly discovered land. The chosen name was euphemistic, but probably not entirely unrealistic. Warming has also been proven elsewhere during this period and is called the "Medieval Warm Period".

The group departed Iceland with 25 ships, of which, according to the description in the land acquisition book, 14 reached the Greenland coast. The farms built by the first settlers on the Eriksfjord formed the core of the Eastern Settlement.

== Settlement and consolidation of society ==
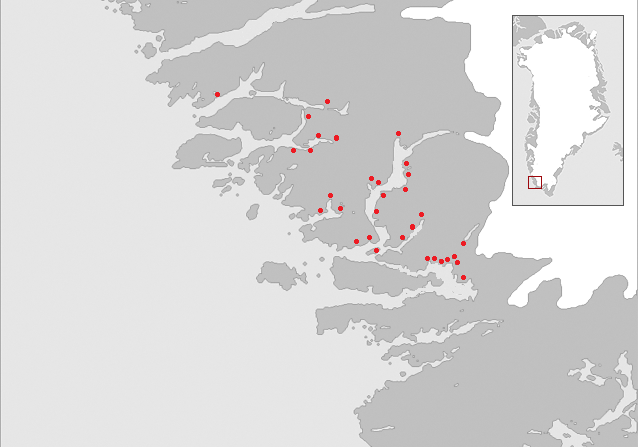
Map of the Middle Settlement (Ivittuut)

Icelandic sources suggest that at least three more fleets carrying settlers reached Greenland in the following 14 years. The Western Settlement was built about 500 km (310 mi) north of the Eastern Settlement, but it always had to exist under less favourable conditions. By 1000, practically all climatically feasible areas of Greenland were populated.

The Norse settled in three separate locations in south-western Greenland: the larger Eastern Settlement, the smaller Western Settlement, and the still smaller Middle Settlement, around Ivittuut, (often considered part of the Eastern one). Estimates put the combined population of the settlements at their height between 2,000 and 10,000, with recent estimates trending toward the lower figure. Archaeologists have identified the ruins of approximately 620 farms: 500 in the Eastern Settlement, 95 in the Western Settlement, and 20 in the Middle Settlement.

It is very likely that Erik the Red held a leadership position in the early days of the colony. In contrast to Norway, Iceland and the Faroe Islands, Greenland was never politically organised as a coherent state. There is no evidence of an official leadership personality for the subsequent period. But the chief in Brattahlíð (Brattahlid) can be said to have a special influence due to its central location and tradition. Since the 14th century, Brattahlíð provided the Lögsögumaður, the speaker of the law; it is not certain whether he performed the same function as in Iceland.

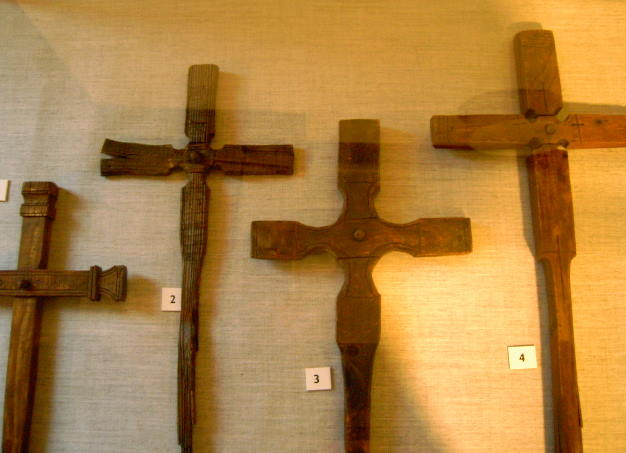
Wooden crosses as grave goods (found in Herjolfsnes)

Although according to tradition Erik the Red was not a Christian, the colony was soon Christianized. However, the Íslendingabók and the Grænlendinga saga (Saga of the Greenlanders) unanimously report that at the first settlement Herjulf Bårdsson (Herjolf), a companion of Erik, had a Christian from the Hebrides on board. According to the Saga of the Greenlanders, Erik's son Leifr (Leif Erikson) brought Christianity to Greenland around 1000. The Óláfs saga Tryggvasonar (Story of Olaf Tryggvason) reports the same thing in the Heimskringla. According to this report, he already had a priest with him. The Grœnlendinga saga did not mention him, but the fact that the wife of Erik the Red, Þjódhild Jorundsdottir, (Thorhild, after the baptism Þjóðhildr – Thjodhild) had a small church built some distance from the court makes the very early presence of a priest appear credible. Apart from a few small amulets, there is no archaeological evidence of the practice of pagan rituals.

Christian churches and chapels have been excavated on numerous farms, including the Church of Brattahlíð, to which the Grœnlendinga saga's account of the little church of Thjodhild fits exactly. These churches were built by the respective landlord, and he was therefore – initially – also entitled to the taxes payable by the parish. Until the 11th century, Greenland was under the Archdiocese of Bremen. The Grœnlendinga saga reports that in 1118 the colony sent Einarr Sokkason to Norway to persuade King Sigurðr Jórsalafari (Sigurd the Jerusalem Rider) to assign Greenland its own bishop. The first Greenlandic bishop was Arnaldr from 1126, whose presumed remains were unearthed under the floor of the church of Garðar (other assumptions go to Bishop Jón Smyrill, died 1209). Several other bishops followed, for whose support significant benefices were set up. Around 1350 the church owned the largest farm and around two thirds of the best pasture land.

The last Greenlandic bishop died in 1378. A successor was also appointed for him, but he refused to give up the relatively comfortable living conditions in Norway and travel to inhospitable Greenland. He was represented there by a vicar. He and his successors did not forgo the Greenlanders' Church tithe.

The lack of an overarching power meant that local rulers found themselves in an endless series of conflicts. In order to end the constant disputes, the Greenland colony subordinated itself to the Norwegian crown in 1261. King Hákon Hákonarson had also been working towards this step for a long time. In return, the colony received the promise of regular shipping connections. This step also resulted in a Norwegian trading monopoly. In 1294, King Eirik Magnusson of Norway issued letters of privilege to local merchants for the Greenland trade. All others, especially the Hanseatic League, were forbidden from shipping to Greenland. Apparently there was regular trade with one or two "state" ships per year until the second half of the 14th century. The Kalmar Union was to prove disastrous for trade with Greenland because the remote outpost was of little interest to the Danish royal family and trade dried up. The extent to which the Hanseatic League filled the gap, defying the Norwegian monopoly, still requires further investigation.

=== Eastern Settlement ===
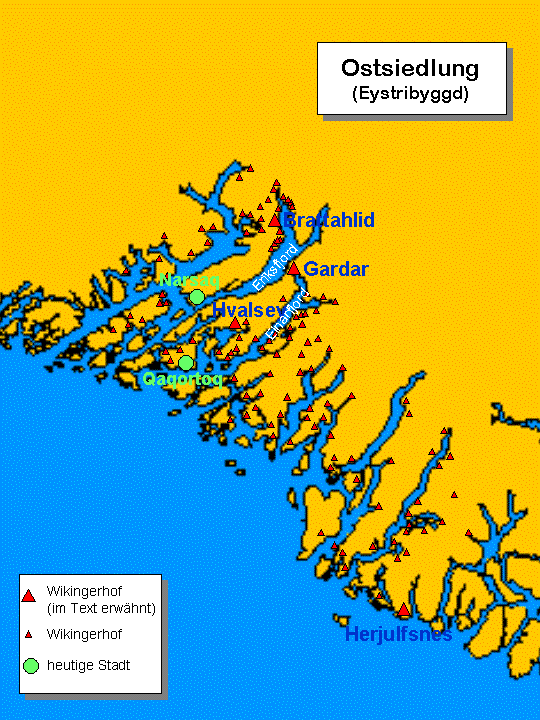
Map of the Eastern Settlement

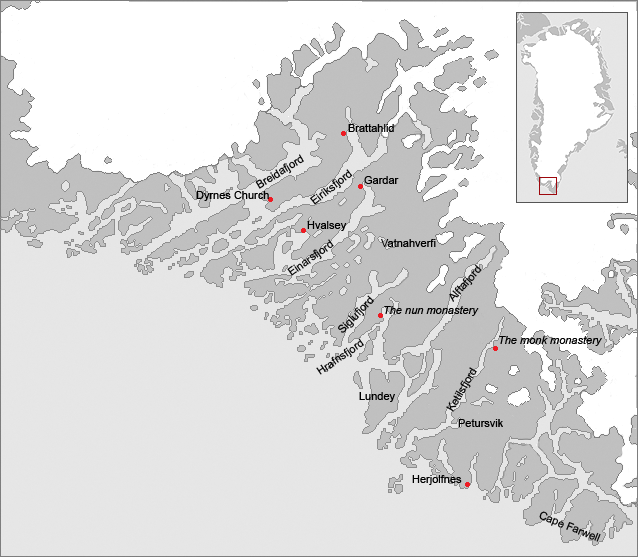
Map of the Eastern Settlement with main courtyards and churches

In the literature, a distinction is made between two Icelandic settlements in Greenland – the larger Eastern Settlement (Eystribyggð) around today's Qaqortoq and the smaller Western Settlement (Vestribyggð) around today's city of Nuuk (Godthåb) – both of which are located on the west coast of Greenland. Due to the far reaches of the Gulf Stream, the climate in these areas is significantly more favourable than in all other areas of Greenland. Between the two settlements there were still a few scattered farms (near today's Ivittuut), which are summarised in some publications as a "middle settlement". In contrast to the Inuit, who needed immediate access to the open sea as hunters and fishermen, the agricultural Grænlendingar settled in the protected areas at the end of the long fjords. The climatic conditions there were more favourable for agriculture and pasture farming. Modern estimates place the total number of Icelanders resettled in Greenland at a maximum of 6,000 people, and more recent estimates suggest just 2,500, most of whom lived in the eastern settlement. So far, the remains of around 300 farms, 16 community churches (plus several chapels), a Benedictine monastery of Saint Olaf near Unartok and a monastery on the Tasermiut Fjord are known.

The excavations at Brattahlíð, especially more so those of a farmstead near Narsaq in the 1950s and '60s, give a good idea of what the settlements looked like. The typical Grænlendingarhof consisted of a group of buildings on a larger area. It included stables for sheep, goats, cattle and – at least in the early days of the settlements – also pigs and Icelandic horses. There were also barns, storehouses and farm buildings, from the remains of which one can conclude that textile production and dairy farming were primarily carried out there. The main building was a conglomeration of interconnecting rooms with a central structure in the style of a longhouse, which was built on a foundation of field stones made of alternating peat sods and layers of stone. The construction method may have been adopted by Inuit, as it was already known to the people of the Saqqaq culture (2400–900 BC). The simple roof structure was made of driftwood (in some farms also made of whale bone) and was covered with sod. A practical and artfully executed water supply and drainage system made of covered canals irrigated and drained the houses. The stables were also built from stones and sod. The cowshed always had two connected rooms, the cattle shed itself with the stalls and a larger feed chamber. The approximately 1.5 m (4 ft 11 in) thick outer wall, made of field stone, was preceded by a wall several metres thick made of sod and earth to insulate it from the cold. There are stone blocks weighing up to 10 t (9.8 long tons; 11 short tons). The more important farms had a church or chapel and a bathhouse, similar to a sauna. Many farms also had remote "Saeters", huts that were only used in the summer months for harvesting hay on remote pastures, a system similar to the Maiensäße in the Alps.

The traditional name is misleading in that this settlement is located on the west coast of Greenland. This is explained by the fact that their location at the end of the Eiriksfjord, which extends to the east, required a longer journey from the coast to the east. The fjord is surrounded by rolling hills and characterised by numerous small and tiny islands. In the sheltered areas in the interior of the fjord, subarctic vegetation blooms lushly in summer. The climate is still the mildest in Greenland today.

The eastern settlement is the oldest Grænlendingar settlement, comprised 192 farms and is located in a sheltered location at the end of the approximately 100 km (62 mi) long Eriksfjord. It goes back directly to a founding by Erik the Red. Fertile soils and rich pastures made livestock farming possible. The Norwegian priest Ívarr Bárðason reported around the middle of the 14th century that even apples were said to have ripened in favourable years.

The Eastern Settlement includes the largest and richest farms in Greenland.

==== Brattahlíð (Qassiarsuk) ====
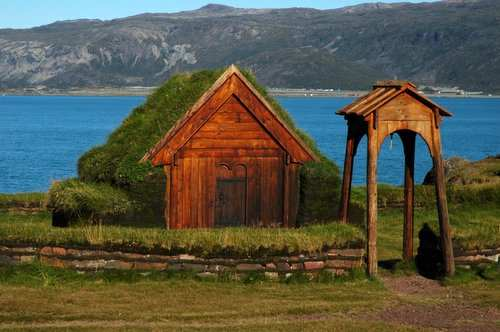
Reconstruction of Brattahlíð Chapel

Erik's farm Brattahlíð (Bratalid) was the most important in the Eastern Settlement; it was excavated in the 1930s. An extensive complex with several interconnecting residential buildings contained an 24 m (80 ft) long hall that served as a central living and meeting room. Two stable buildings accommodated 50 cows. The dimensions of the boxes and the bone finds suggest that the cattle, with a shoulder height of around 1.20 m (3 ft 11 in), were much smaller than today's cattle. The foundations of several storehouses and farm buildings as well as a blacksmith shop have also been preserved.

On the site, slightly separated from the main complex, was the earth-walled church of Brattahlíð, of which only sparse remains remain today (a reconstruction was built on the site a few years ago) and what is now known as the church built by Thjodhild applies. A cemetery was excavated around the church containing 144 skeletons, 24 of which were children, 65 men, 39 women and 16 adults whose sex could not be determined. About half of the men – quite a few over 1.80 m (5 ft 11 in) tall – were between 40 and 60 years old. Many of them showed clear signs of arthritis and badly worn teeth. There is a mass grave in the cemetery containing the remains of 13 people. These skeletons, as well as several others, show traces of sword and axe blows, which suggest endemic violence.

==== Garðar ====
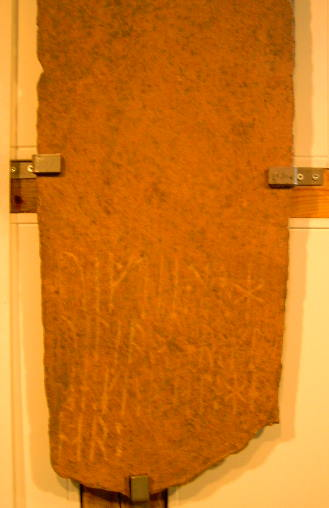
Runestone from Garðar

Garðar (today Igaliku) lies on a fertile plain between the Eriksfjord and the Einarfjord and was the episcopal see of Greenland. The largest agricultural property – even before Brattahlíð – was owned by the church. Garðar Cathedral Ruins, dedicated to Saint Nicholas, of which little more than the foundation walls remain, was 27 m (89 ft) long when completed at the beginning of the 13th century and 16 m (52 ft) wide in the cross choir including the side chapels. It had windows made of greenish glass and a bell tower with bronze bells, both of which were particularly valuable imported goods.

To the south of the church and connected by a tiled path, there was a large building complex with several rooms and a hall measuring 16.75 m × 7.75 m (55.0 ft × 25.4 ft) as the bishop's residence. The farm included a well and two large stables – the larger of which was 60 m (200 ft) long – which could accommodate 100 cows, as well as several storehouses and farm buildings. This also included a forge where traces of bog iron were found. Connected to the property was a harbour with boat sheds on the Einarsfjord. In total, the complex includes around 40 larger and smaller buildings and this alone proves the outstanding position that Garðar held in Greenland's Viking society.

==== Hvalsey (Qaqortukulooq) ====
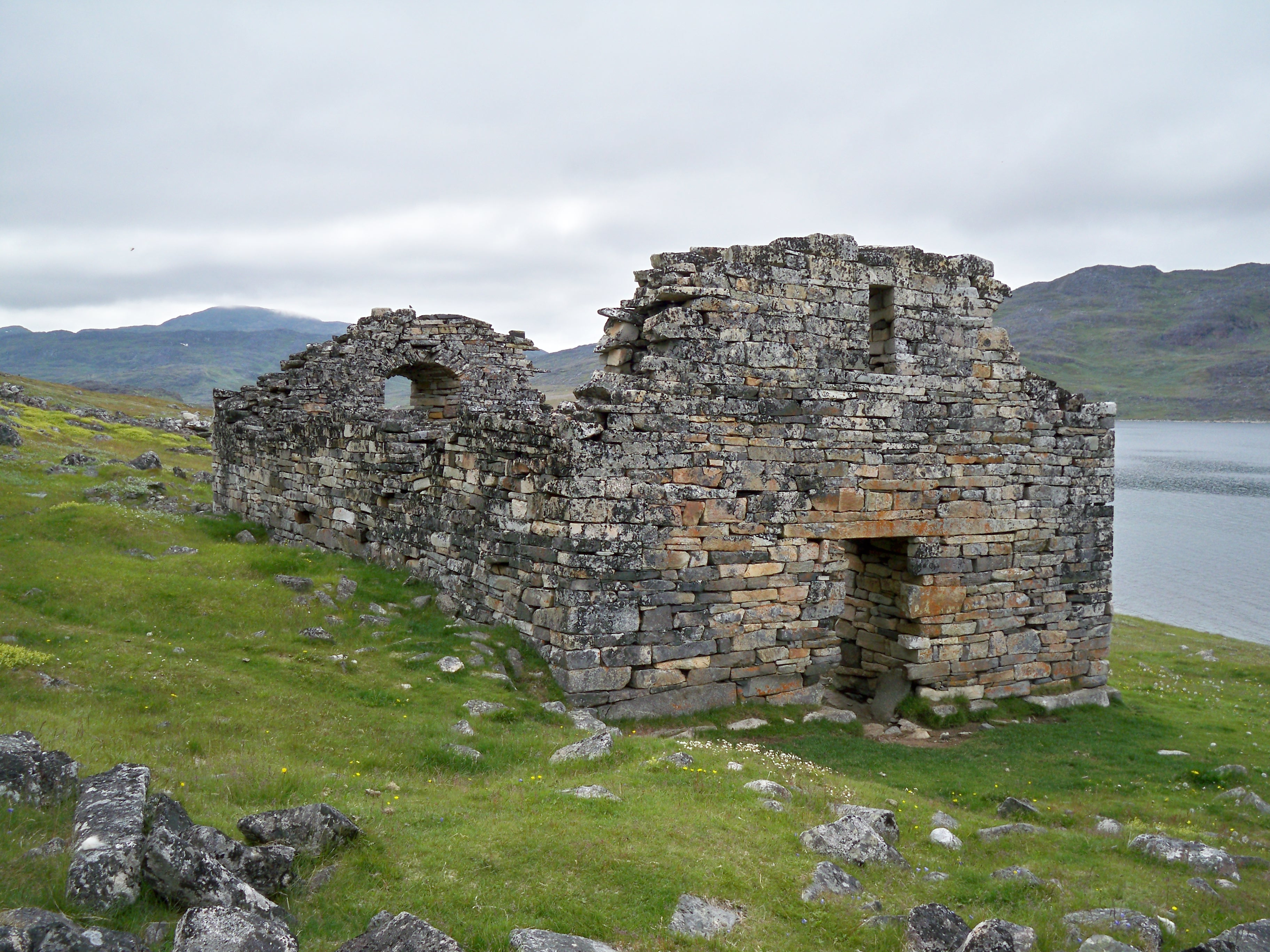
Ruins of Hvalsey Church

Hvalsey Church is the best-preserved Grænlendingar building today. The simple, rectangular church was built around 1300 on a gentle slope not far from the fjord shore. As is usual with old churches, it is oriented east-west. The approximately 1.5 m (4 ft 11 in) thick walls are artfully stacked stone. Clay may also have been used as mortar. Turf then covered the clay. There is evidence that the exterior walls were originally whitewashed. The church has a low doorway with a rectangular window above it on the west facade and a larger window with a Romanesque arch on the east facade. Another door and two slit windows are on the south wall. The window niches expand inwards in a funnel shape – a design that is also seen in early churches in the British Isles. The gables are approximately 5m high. There are a few wall niches, but no decoration inside the church. The roof, which is no longer preserved, was originally made of wood and sod. The appearance corresponds to churches in the Faroe Islands, Orkney and Shetland. Since church buildings in Iceland and Norway were usually made of wood, this may suggest regular contact between the colony and the British Isles. The church was the scene of the last recorded event in Greenland. A wedding took place there on 14 September 1408. The guests came from Iceland in 1408 and returned in 1410.

Of the surrounding courtyards, only sparse remains of residential buildings, stables, warehouses and storehouses remain; some of them have not yet been examined by archaeologists.

=== Western Settlement ===
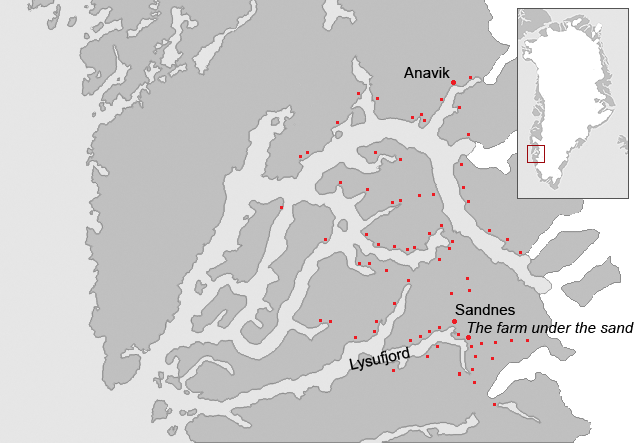
Map of the Western Settlement

The Western Settlement is located about 500 km (310 mi) north of the eastern settlement in the area around today's capital Nuuk (Godthåb) in a less favourable climatic location. It was smaller and more modestly equipped and comprised around 90 farms near today's Kapisillit (Lakskaj).

==== Farm beneath the sand ====
From 1991 to 1996, the Danish Polar Center, in collaboration with the University of Alberta, researched the "Gården under sandet or Farm beneath the sand" in the Western Settlement, which dates back to between 1000 and 1400 AD. The excavation results provided important insights into the architecture and construction of a Viking residential building as well as the residents' food supply.

The excavation field is located on a hill at the end of the Lysufjord, about 80 km (50 mi) east of Nuuk. The rectangular residential building measuring 12 m × 5 m (39 ft × 16 ft) was built entirely from peat sods, which were stacked on top of each other at an angle of approx. 45° and formed walls 1.9 m (6 ft 3 in) thick. The roof was made of wooden rafters (probably driftwood) and was covered with wattle and daub with long pieces of peat resting on it. In the middle of the house there was a long fireplace (Langeldr) with seats in the two side aisles. A cooking zone with a separate fireplace (Maleldr) was on the north side.

As can be concluded from the excavated waste, the inhabitants' diet included both wild animals (fish, birds and mammals) and domesticated animals. The main food fish was Arctic char (Salvelinus alpinus), followed by Atlantic cod (Gadus morhua) and capelin (Mallotus villosus). The bird bones found and identified come primarily from rock ptarmigan (Lagopus muta) and to a lesser extent from mallards (Anas platyrhynchos) and common eider ducks (Somateria mollissima). Important food animals from the mammalian fauna were seals and caribou. The excavated remains of the breeding animals come – in roughly equal proportions – mainly from sheep and goats as well as from a horse. Bones of domestic cattle were also found. Based on the teeth, it was possible to determine that the cows lived to a relatively old age and were therefore used more for milk production than for meat production. The comparative measurements taken prove that the domesticated animals were rather small and strong in stature.

Earth samples proved that the Vikings used slash-and-burn agriculture to cultivate the area and burned down the birch bushes that originally grew there to create pastures.

In summary, the excavation results so far allow us to conclude that the living conditions were significantly less favourable than in the Eastern Settlement.

=== The northern hunting grounds (Norðrsetur) ===
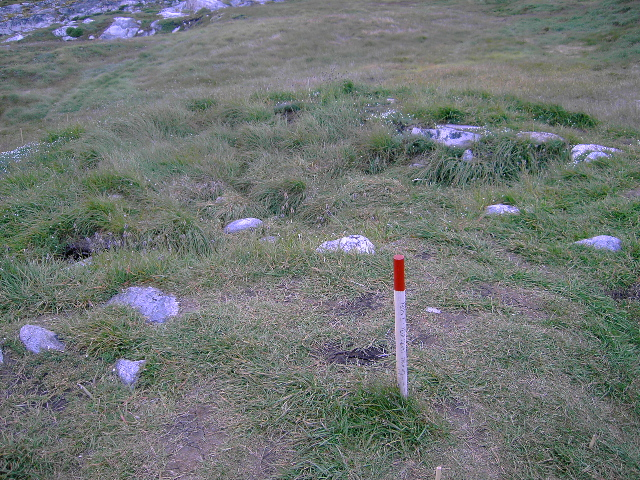
Hunting place of the Paleo-Eskimo Saqqaq culture at Disko Bay

The northern hunting area played an important role in the food supply and in the procurement of export goods. It was probably located at a latitude of 70° in the area of today's Disko Bay. There are no known permanent Viking settlements north of the Arctic Circle, but written sources provide evidence of annual hunting expeditions in the summer months. These ventures served to provide the essential supply of meat as a nutritional supplement, but also to procure walrus ivory, narwhal teeth, seal and polar bear fur, eider down, muskox horns and caribou antlers. Norðrsetur could be reached by rowed boats in 30 days from the western settlement and in 50 days from the eastern settlement.

In this area there may also have been encounters with proto-Inuit of the Thule culture. Settlements and hunting grounds of Inuit cultures dating to as early as 2500 B.C. have been documented at Disko Bay (Qeqertarsuup tunua). However, the scholar Fredrik Ljungqvist cautions:

It is likely that the Norse–Inuit contacts in the Norðrsetur region provided the Norse with trading opportunities…. There is, however, no evidence of contact between the Norse and the Inuit having been so well developed that it could have constituted an acceptable alternative to [the Norse's] own hunting.

There is also clear evidence of occasional expeditions even further north. In 1824 three cairns were discovered on Kingittorsuaq Island at a latitude of 73°. A 12 cm (4.7 in) long runestone, known as the Kingittorsuaq Runestone, from the early 14th century was inserted into one of them, which names the date 25 April (the year is not specified) and the three members of such a hunting expedition.

== Way of life, trade, economy and food supply ==
Historical artefacts
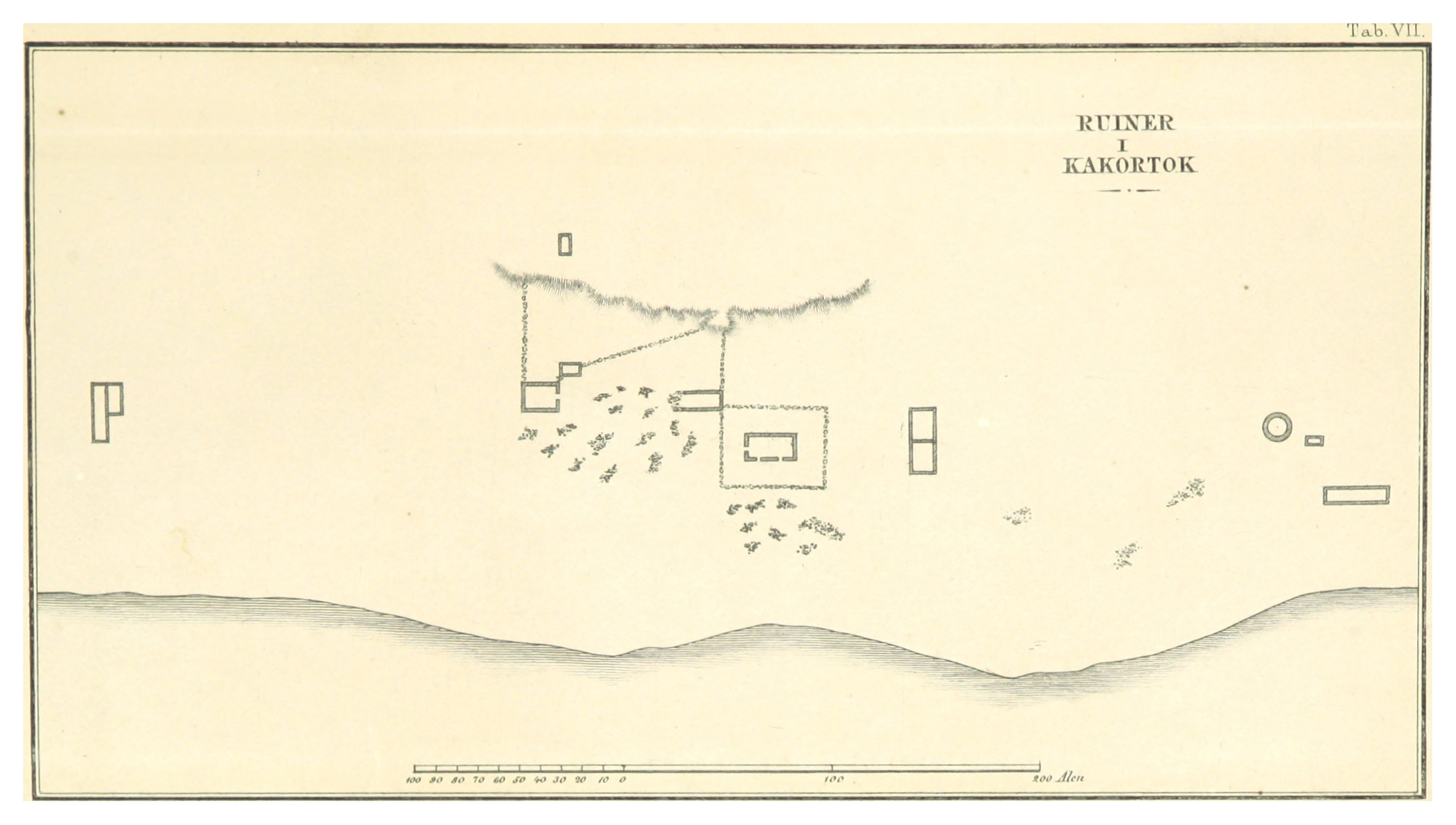
Settlement structure of Qaqortoq

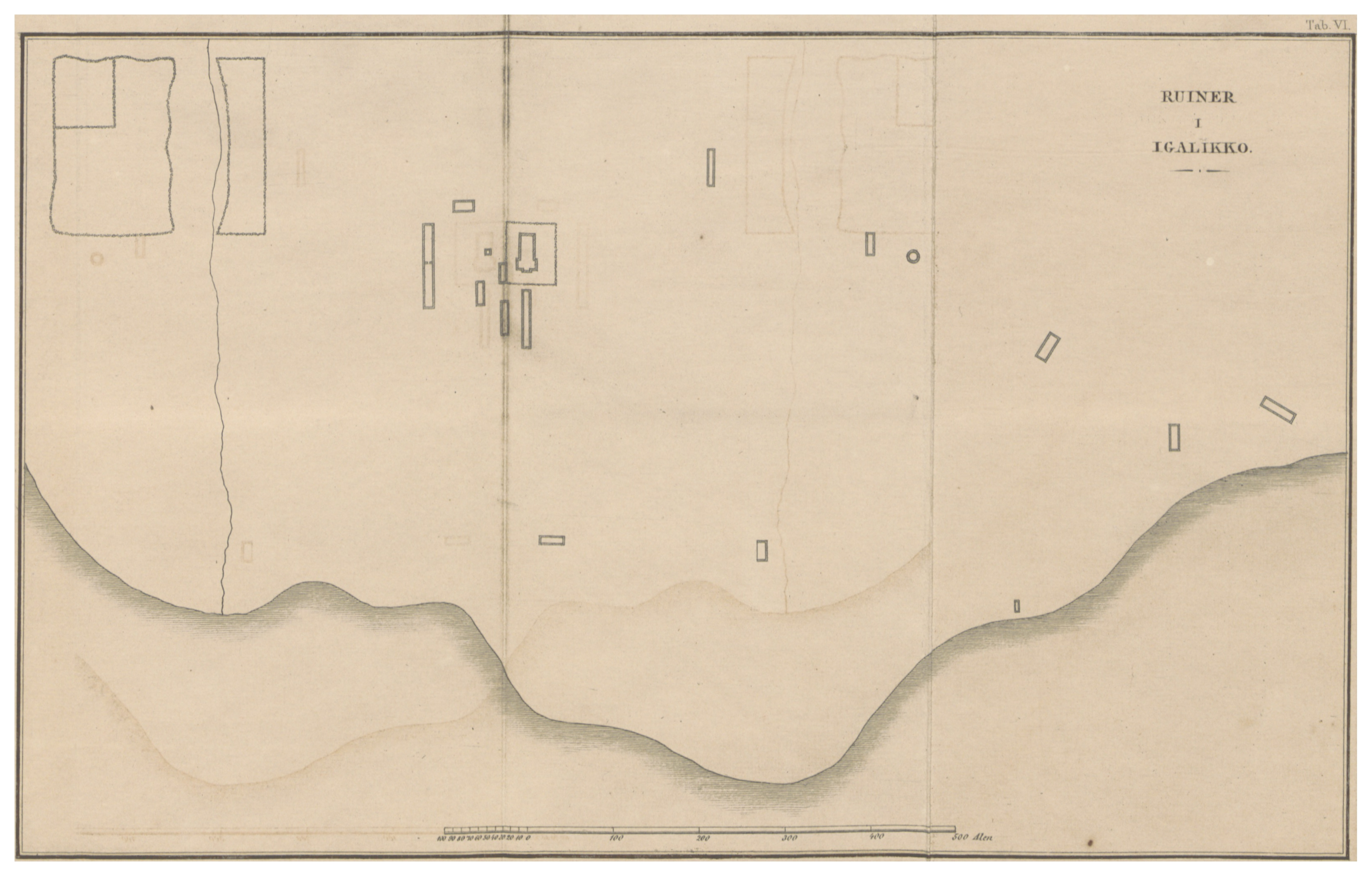
Settlement structure of Igaliku

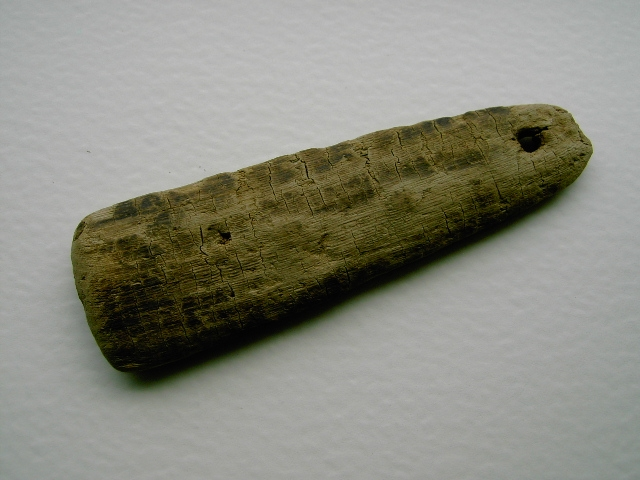
Float for a fishing net

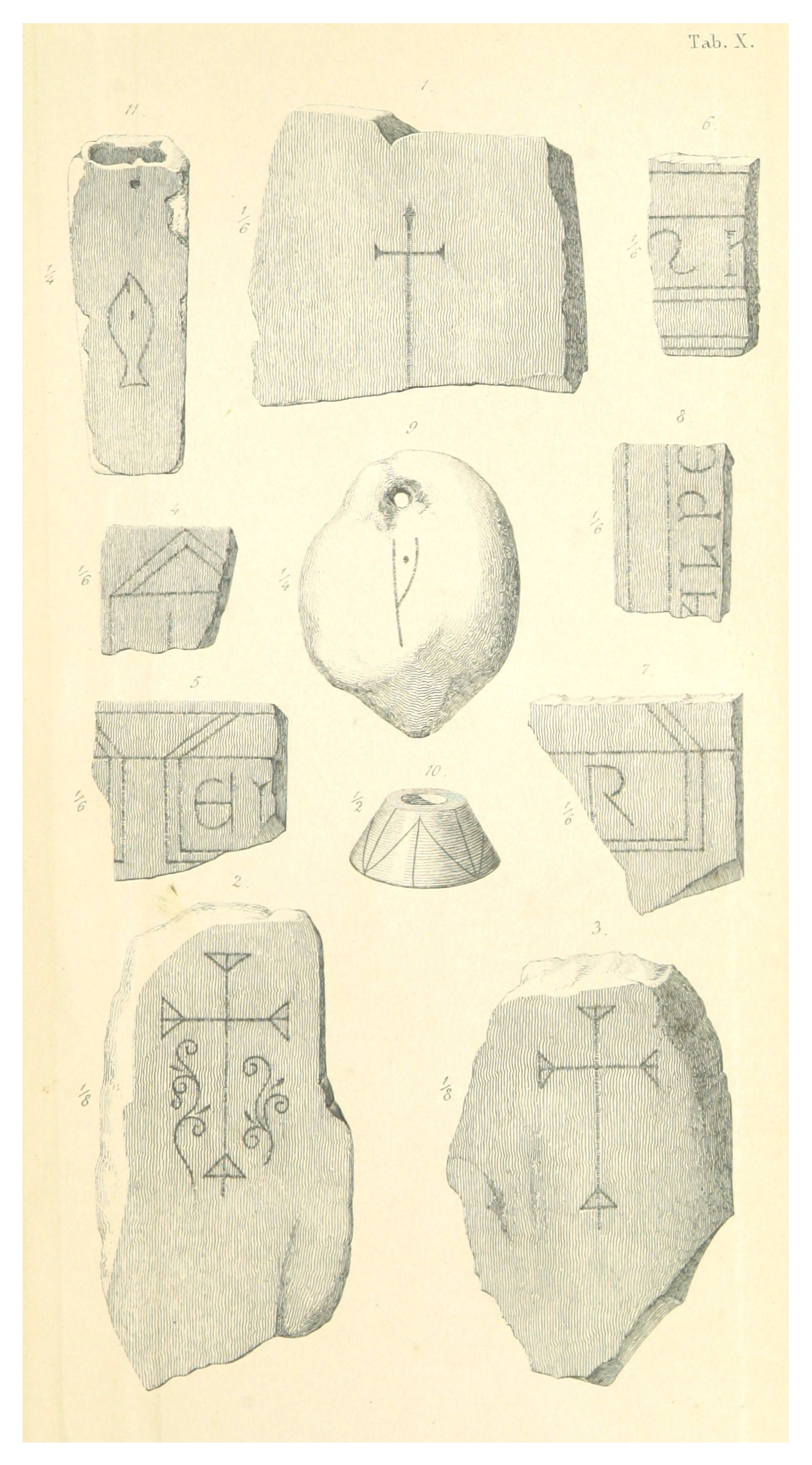
Fragments of household devices (carvings as owner's marks)

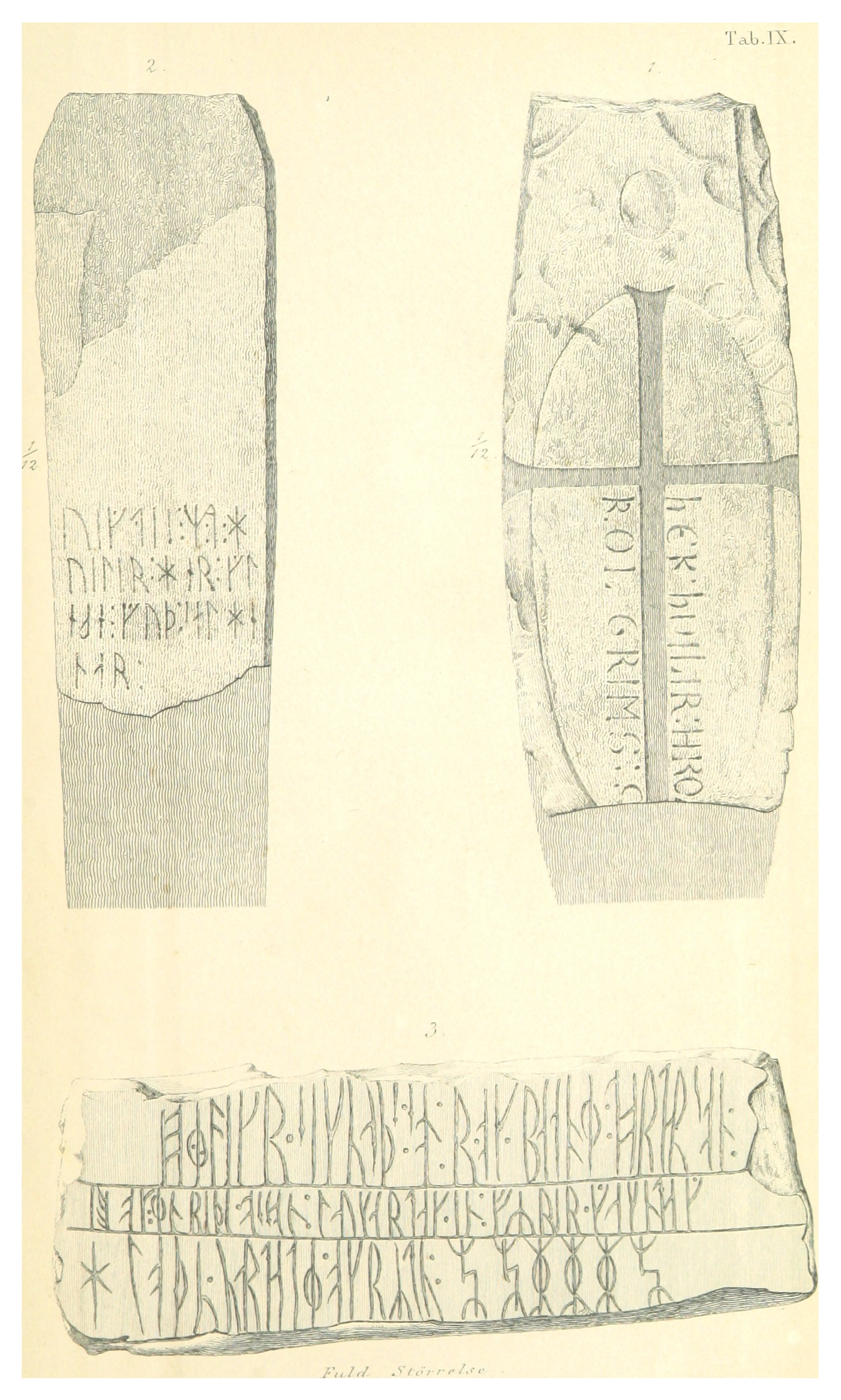
Grave and runestones

The living conditions must have been similar to those in Iceland. Of the 24 children's skeletons at the Thjodhilds Church in Brattahlíð, 15 were of infants, one child was three years old, one was seven years old and four were eleven to twelve years old. The infant mortality rate in Iceland in 1850 was of a similar magnitude, even if one takes into account that not all dead newborns were buried at the church. The small number of older children who died indicates good living conditions. Nor do any infectious diseases appear to have raged on a large scale. Of the 53 men outside the common grave, 23 were between 30 and 50 years old. Of the 39 women, there were only three, and only one got older. There are also a few from a group whose age over 20 could not be determined. The average height of men was 171 cm (67 in) – quite a few were 184–185 cm (72–73 in) – and that of women was 156 cm (61 in); this is higher than the average in Denmark around 1900. All had good teeth, although significantly worn, and there was no tooth decay. The most common disease identified in the skeletons was severe gout in the back and hips. Some were so crooked and stiff in the joints that they could not be laid down for burial. However, gout was widespread in Scandinavia during the Viking Age. Other diseases can no longer be diagnosed today. The custom of the burial place was also adopted from Norway and Iceland: female skeletons predominate in the north and male skeletons in the south of the church. The greater the distance from the church, the more superficial the burial, which suggests that the distance of the grave from the church depended on the social status of the dead person.

The Greenlandic economy was based primarily on three pillars: livestock farming, hunting and catching animals, which provided food, and trade goods in varying proportions. Because of the large pasture areas required for livestock breeding, the farms were widely separated from each other and were effectively self-sufficient.

The Norwegian textbook Konungs skuggsjá (King’s Mirror) reports in the 13th century that the Greenlandic farmers lived primarily on meat, milk (skyr, a sour milk product similar to quark), butter and cheese. Archaeologist Thomas McGovern from the City University of New York used rubbish piles to study the diet of Scandinavian Greenlanders. He found that the meat diet consisted on average of 20 percent beef, 20 percent goat and sheep meat, 45 percent seal meat, 10 percent caribou and 5 percent other meat, with the proportion of caribou and seal meat being significantly higher in the poorer Western Settlement was than in the Eastern Settlement. Apparently the inhabitants also regularly fished, because floats and weights from fishing nets were found in the settlements.

Finds of hand mills in some farms in the eastern settlement suggest that grain was also grown to a small extent in favoured locations. But it was probably mainly imported. The Kongungs skuggsjá reports that only the most powerful Bonden (with farms in the best locations) grew some grain for their own use.

An important source of vitamins was "Kvan" (Angelica), which was brought to Greenland by the settlers and can still be found in gardens there today. Stems and roots can be prepared as a salad or vegetable.

The constant lack of wood proved to be a problem. At the turn of the millennium, only small dwarf birches and dwarf willows grew in Greenland, and their use as timber was limited. The driftwood washed ashore with the Gulf Stream was of inferior quality. Therefore, lumber was an important (and expensive) imported commodity.

Other crucial imports were iron implements and weapons. There were no known ore deposits in Greenland at the time of the Vikings. The already not very productive smelting of iron ore quickly reached its limits due to the lack of suitable fuel (charcoal), so that the settlements were almost entirely dependent on imports. An example shows how dramatic the iron shortage was: During excavations in the Western Settlement in the 1930s, a battle axe was found. It was modelled down to the smallest detail on an iron axe, but made from whale bone.

Besides drying, curing was the only way to preserve meat. This required salt, which also had to be imported.

The settlement also had a number of export goods that were very popular in the rest of Europe:

The white gyrfalcons of Greenland were a very sought-after export item and reached the Arab countries along complex trade routes. The narwhal tusk, which was believed in European royal and princely courts to be able to neutralise poison, was even more highly prized. Europeans assumed that the snail-like, twisted and pointed horn came from the legendary unicorn.

Both individual farmers and groups of farmers organised summer trips to the more northerly Disko Bay area, where they hunted walruses, narwhals and polar bears for their skins, hides and ivory. Besides their use in making garments and shoes, these resources also functioned as a form of currency, as well as providing the most important export commodities. Strong and durable ship ropes were made from walrus skins.

The Greenlandic settlements carried on a trade with Europe in ivory from walrus tusks, as well as exporting rope, sheep, seals, wool and cattle hides (according to one 13th-century account).

== Encounters with Inuit / Paleo-Eskimo ==
Grænlendingar and Inuit
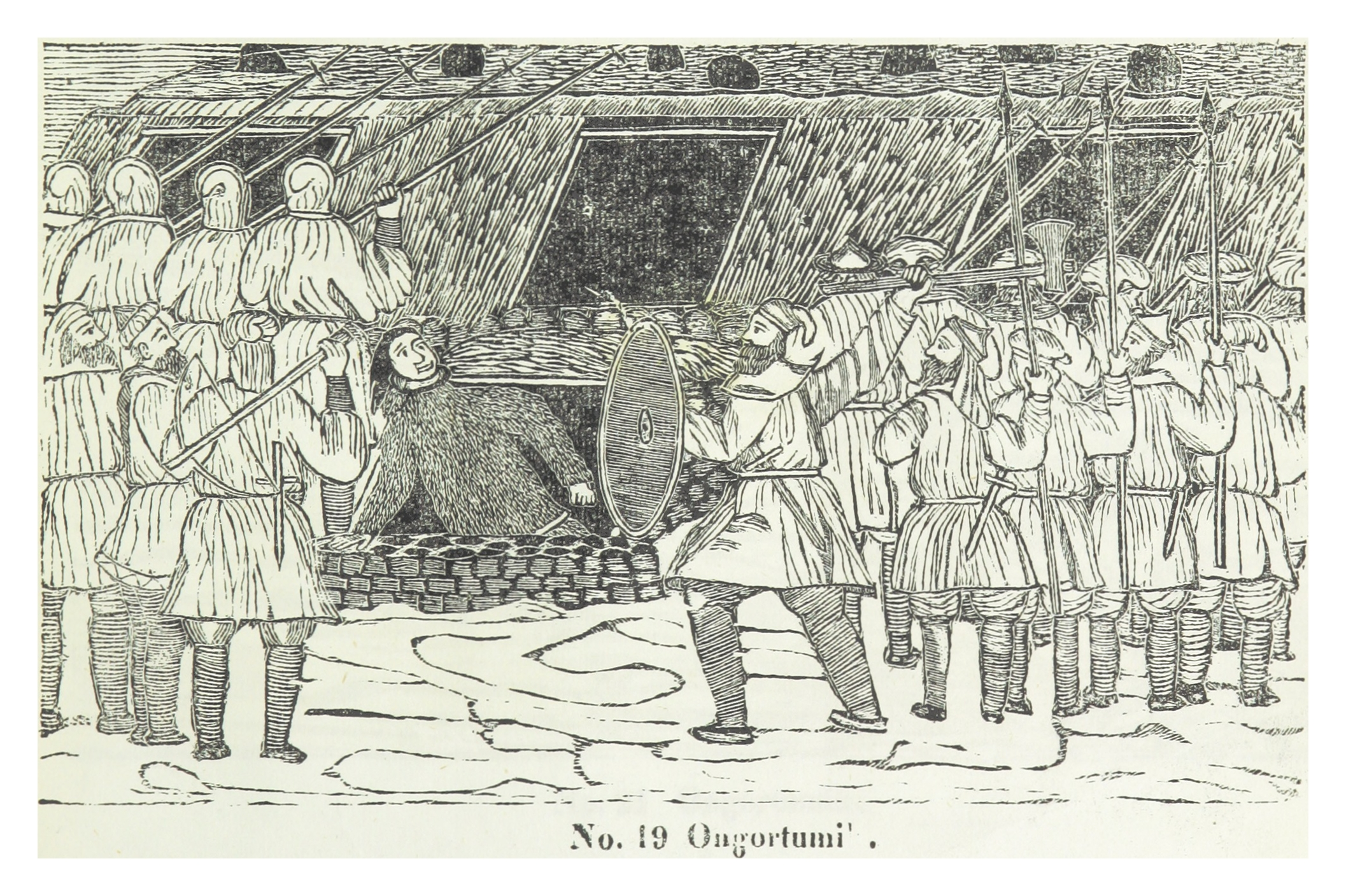
Grænlendingar fighting Inuit

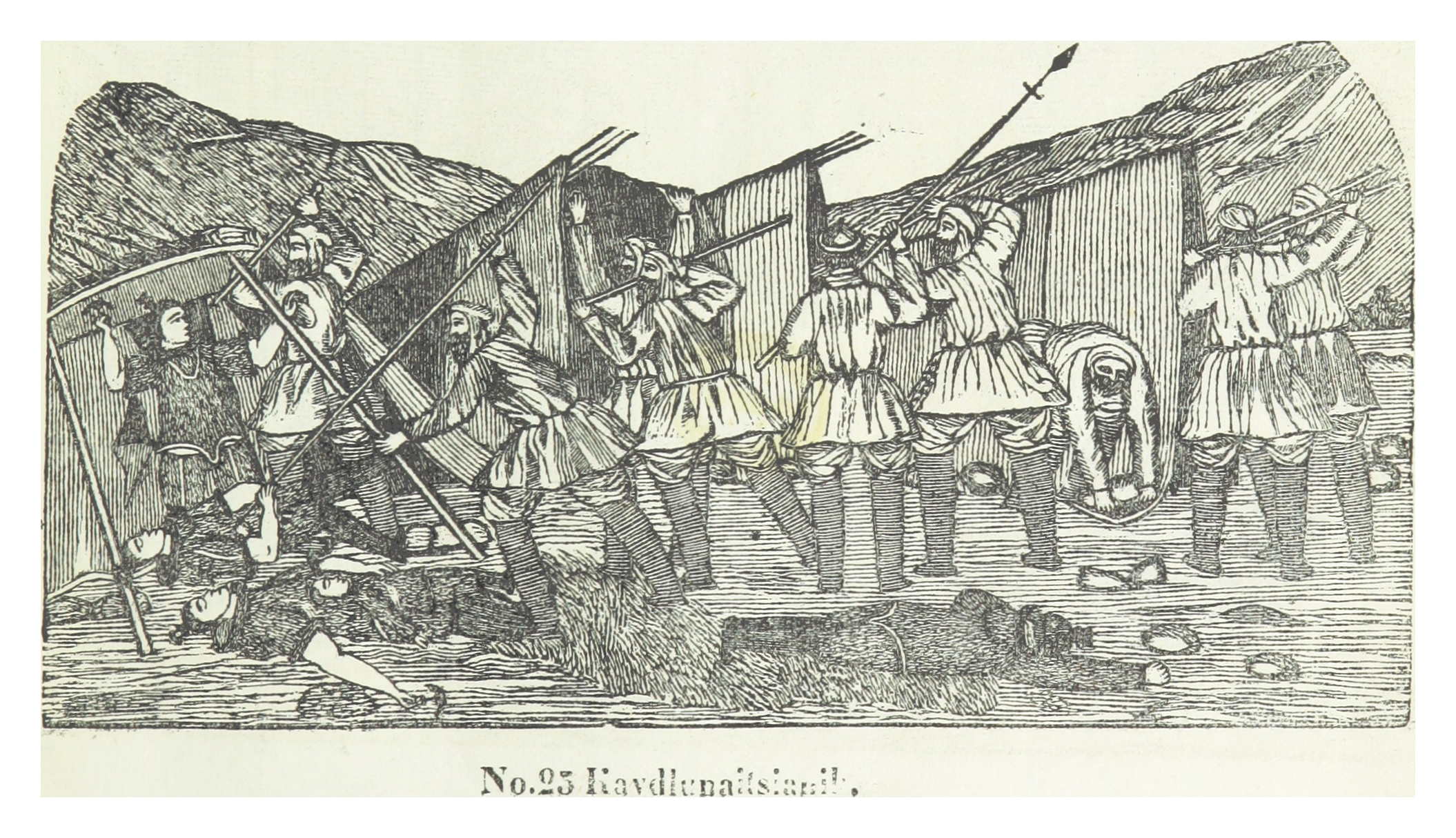
Grænlendingar raid an Inuit summer camp

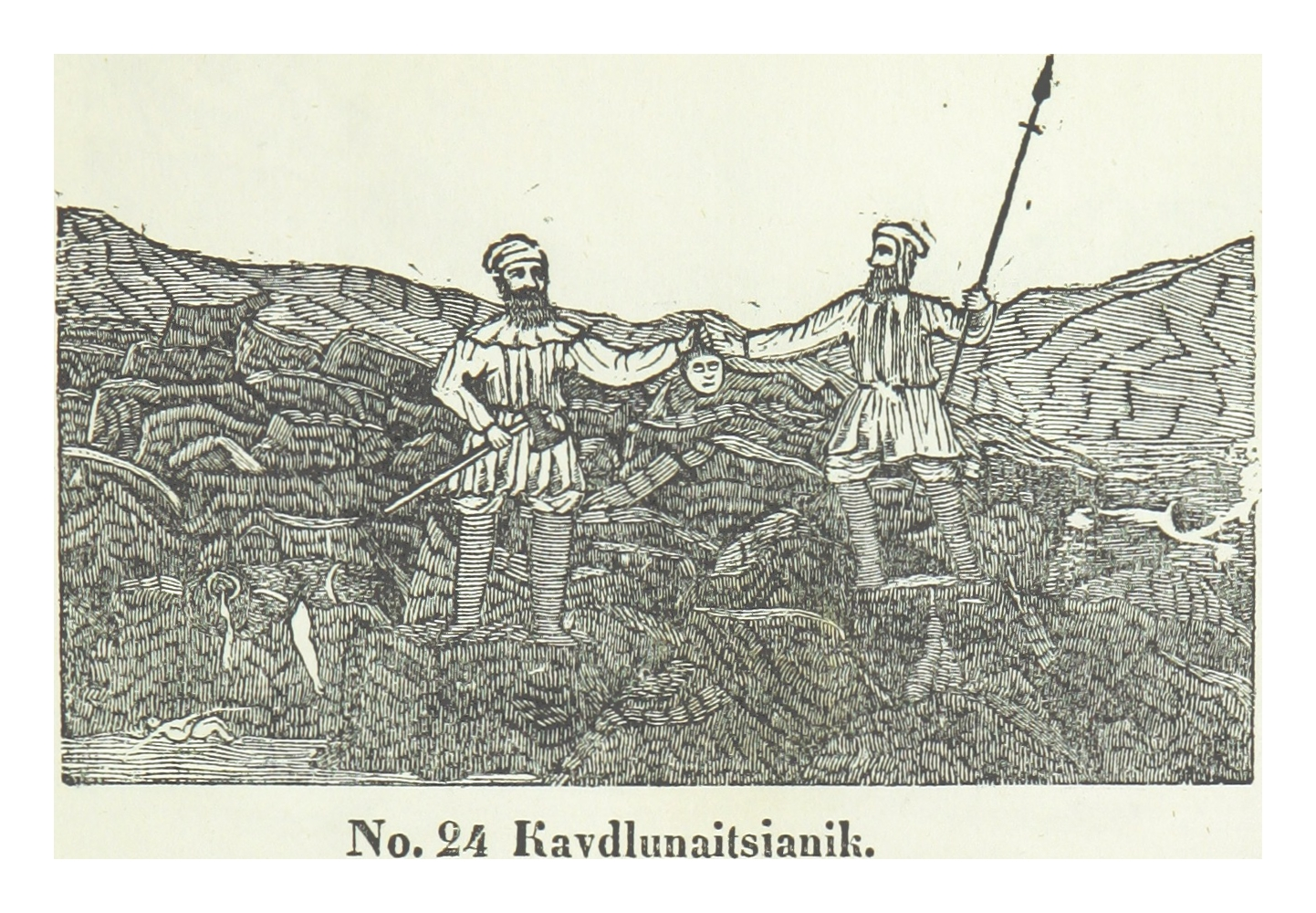
Grænlendingar slay an Inuk and his child

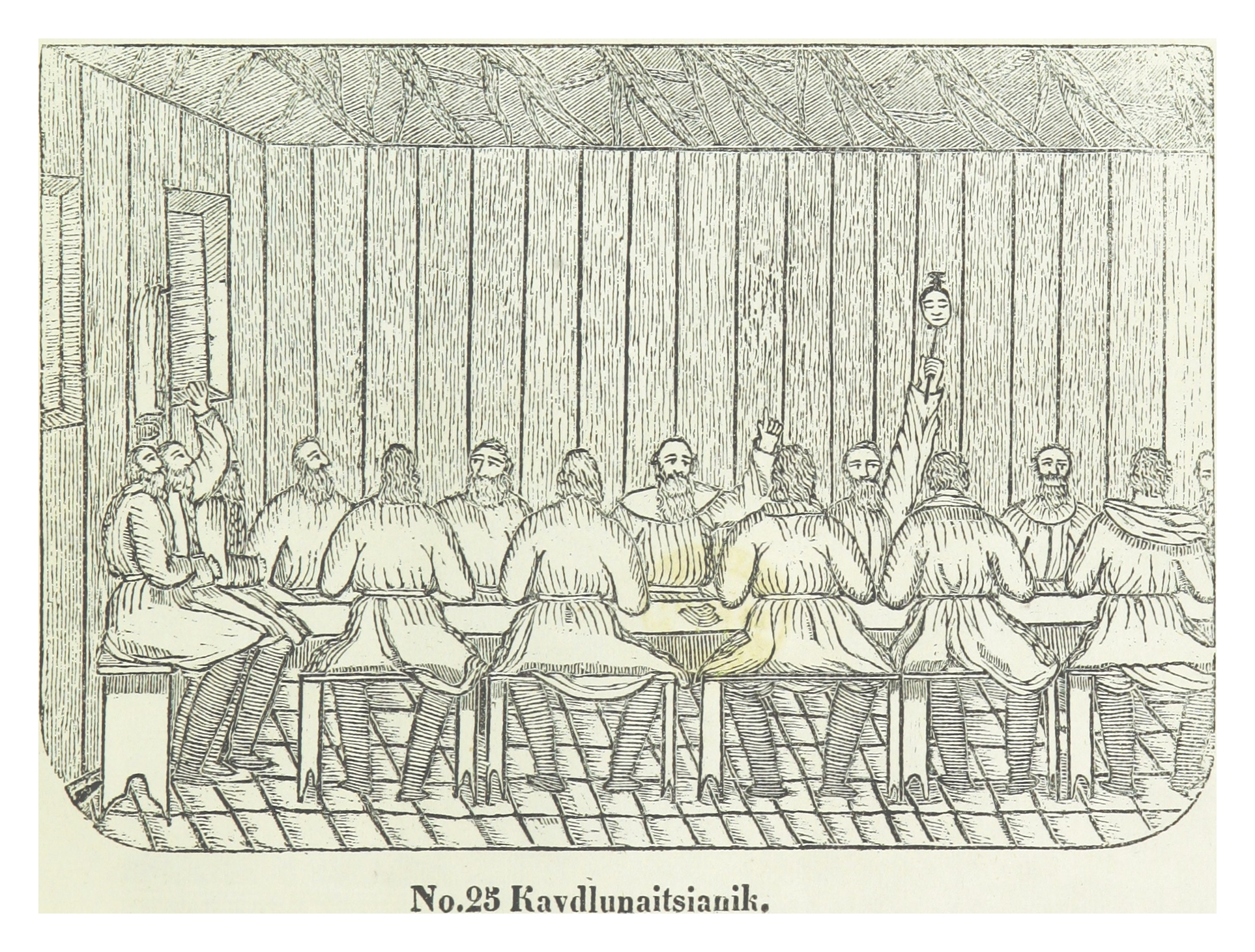
Grænlendingar from modern-day Qaqortoq (Julianehaab) celebrate the death of an Inuk

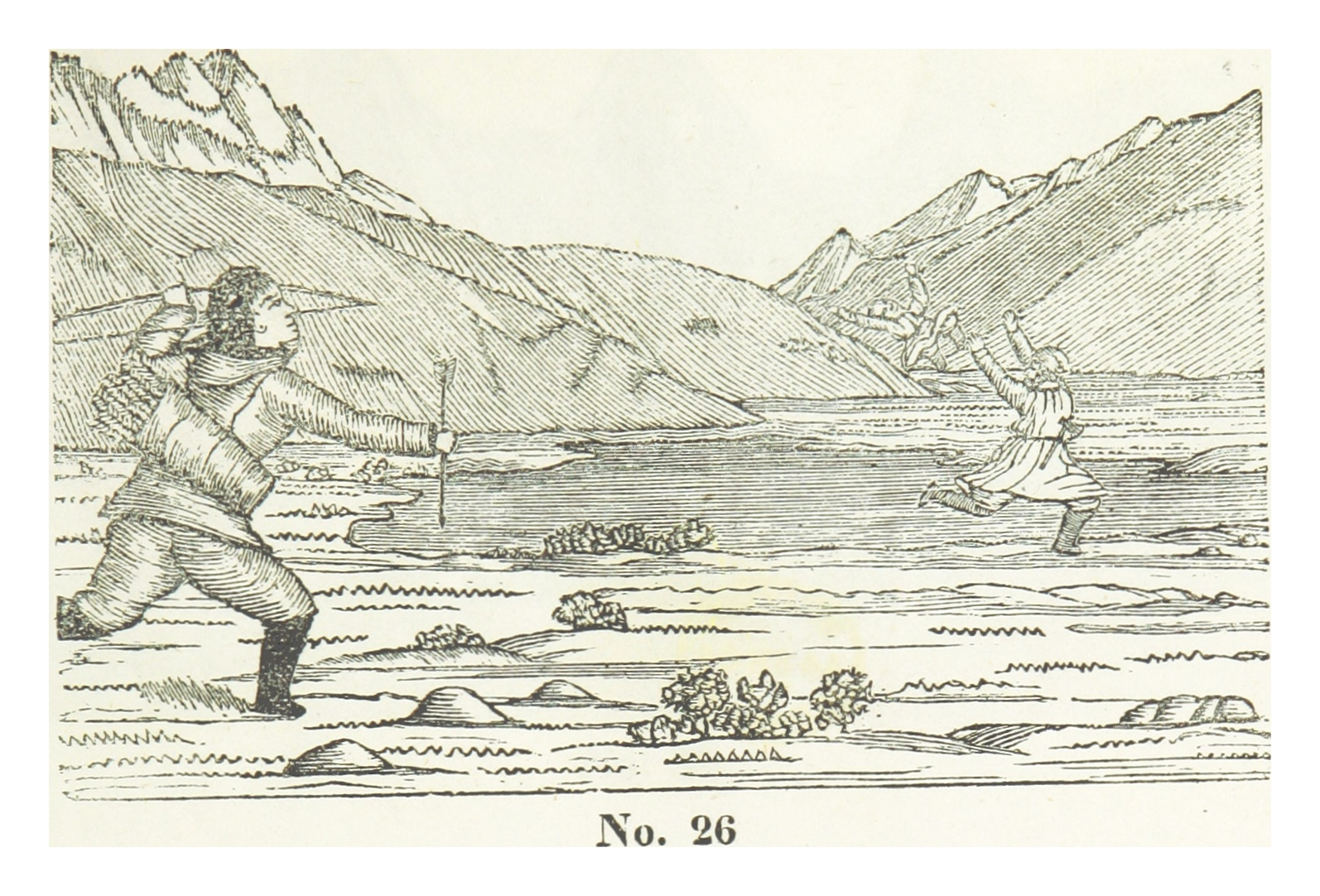
Inuit pursue Grænlendingar

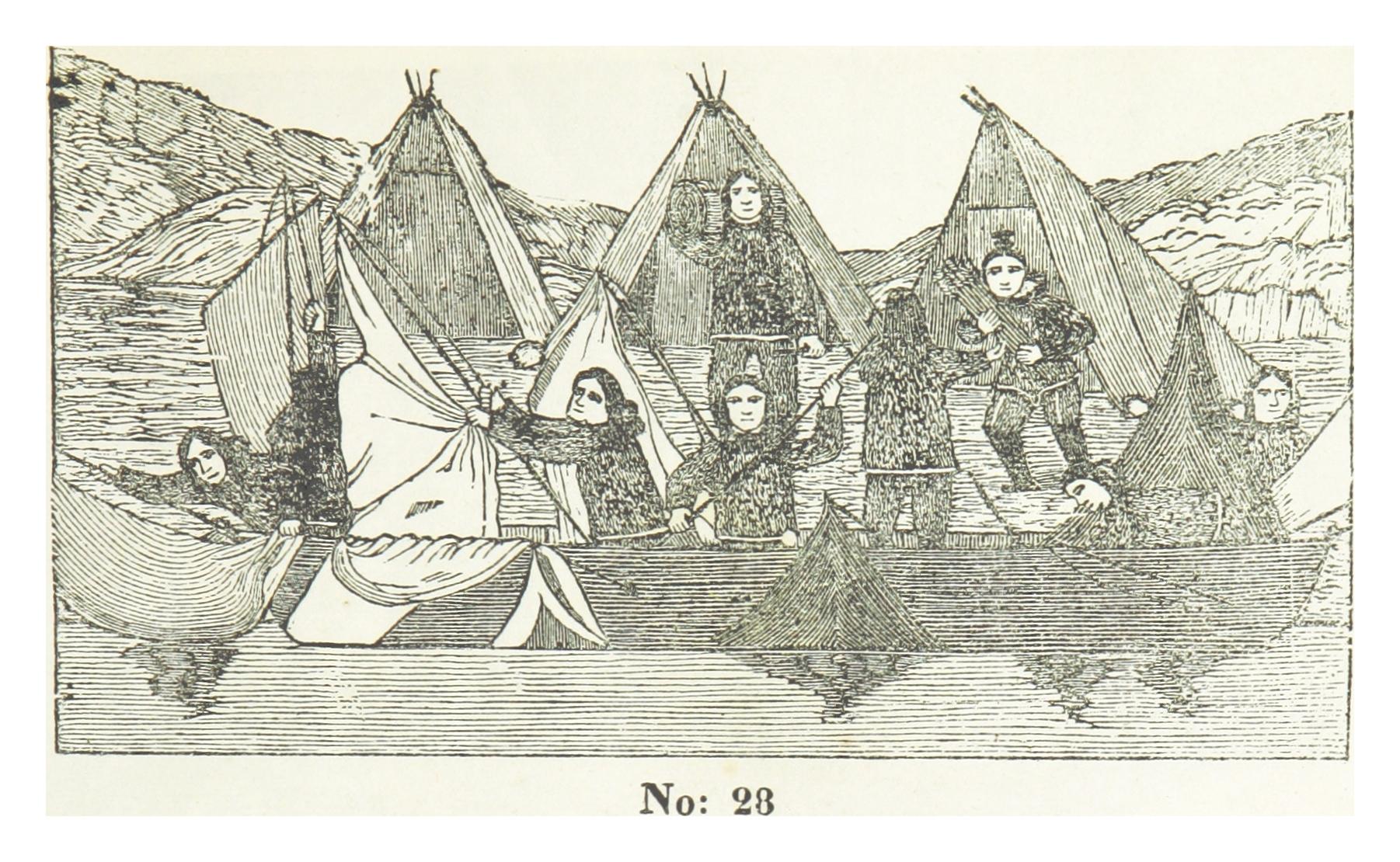
Neighbouring Inuit prepare for battle against settlers of modern-day Qaqortoq

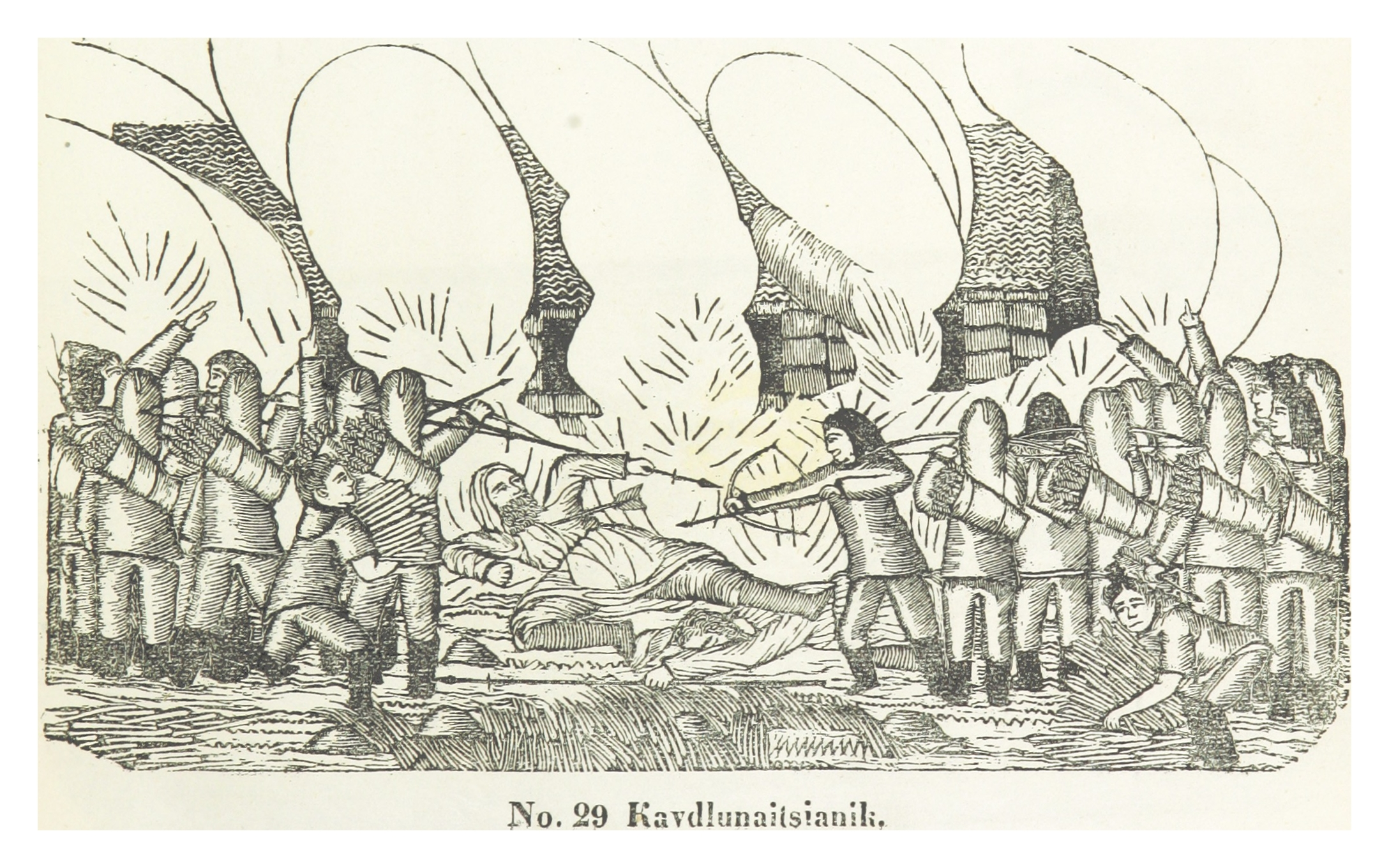
Death of the last Grænlendingar of modern-day Qaqortoq

Both archaeological finds and written evidence show that there were encounters between Inuit cultures (Paleo-Eskimo or Dorset cultures) and Scandinavians. Whether these encounters were regular trade relations or just occasional – possibly warlike – contacts is controversial. Inuit oral traditions, which were only recorded in writing in the 18th and 19th centuries, report several military conflicts. Scandinavian relics, especially iron objects, have been discovered several times in Inuit archaeological sites. It is unknown whether these were obtained through peaceful exchange or robbery.

The Saga of Erik the Red (Eiríks saga rauða) tells of a battle that the Icelander Thorfinn Karlsefni fought with the skrælingjar and in which two of Karlsefni's men and four Inuit were killed. In the Icelandic Gottskálks Annálar it is recorded for 1379 that skrælingjar raided the Grænlendingar, killed 18 men and enslaved two servants. However, the authenticity and accuracy of this source is doubted by some historians, and both Jared Diamond and Jørgen Meldgaard caution that it may actually describe an attack that occurred between Norse and Sámi in Northern Europe, or an attack on the Icelandic coast by European pirates, assuming such an attack really did occur. A church document describes a 1418 attack that has been attributed to Inuit by modern scholars, however historian Jack Forbes has claimed that this supposed attack actually refers to a Russian-Karelian attack on Norse settlers in Northern Norway, which was known locally as Greenland and has been mistaken by modern scholars for Greenland located in North America. Archaeological examinations, however, have revealed that many Norse farms were burned down, and there are signs that the Western settlement was left in haste. This has led some historians to maintain that attacks from Inuit played a large role in the disappearance of the Norse settlements.

== Norse abandonment ==
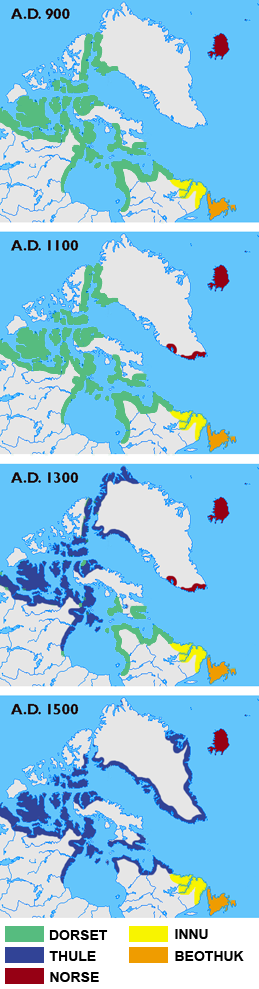
Greenland settlements from 900 to 1500

As opposed to the Norse settlements in Iceland, which continue to persist and form a national identity, the Norse settlements in Greenland were abandoned between 1350 and 1500 and have no historical continuity with the contemporary Danish presence. The decline of the settlements and their contacts with Iceland and the Norse mainland appears to have been a slow process with multi-layered causes.

The Greenland carrier (Groenlands Knorr) made the Greenland run at intervals until 1369, when she sank and was apparently not replaced.

Sometime between 1350 and 1400, the Greenland western settlement was abandoned. Ívar Bárðarson (Ivar Bardarson), a priest from Norway, sailed from the Eastern to the Western Settlement in 1350, but did not find anyone living there. As a result, King Magnus Eriksson of Sweden and Norway sent a Swedish-Norwegian expedition to western Greenland in 1355 to help the settlers. Captain Paul Knutson reached the Western Settlement, but did not find any Norse.

The last recorded Norwegian merchant ship reached Greenland in 1406. Captain Þórsteinn Óláfsson (Thorstein Olafsson) stayed in Greenland for a few years and married Sigríðr Bjarnardóttir (Sigrid Björnsdottir) in the church of Hvalsey in 1408. This report in the Nýi Annáll is the last evident written record of people who were in Greenland. Later there are reports in the various Annálar about observations of people on Greenland (see the translated sources). After that, no contacts with the rest of Europe can be found in terms of sources. Whether they were actually broken off is doubtful given the archaeological findings.

The Danish cartographer Claudius Clavus seems to have visited Greenland in 1420, according to documents written by Nicolaus Germanus and Henricus Martellus Germanus, who had access to original cartographic notes and a map by Clavus. In the late 20th century the Danish scholars Axel Anthon Bjørnbo and Carl S. Petersen found two mathematical manuscripts containing the second chart of the Claudius Clavus map from his journey to Greenland (where he mapped the area).

There are suggestions of voyages from Europe to Greenland, possibly as late as the 1480s.

In 1534, the Icelandic bishop Ögmundur Pálsson of Skálholt claims to have seen people and sheep pens on the west coast. In the municipal archives of Hamburg there is a contemporary report that tells of the journey of a Kraweel from the Hanseatic League city to Greenland. Captain Gerd Mestemaker reached the west coast in 1541, but he "couldn’t get to anyone alive" there.

A European ship that landed in the former Eastern Settlement in the 1540s allegedly found the corpse of a Norse man there, which may be the last mention of a Norse individual from the settlement. The Icelandic seafarer Jon Greenlander, who visited Greenland around 1540, described the dead Norse Greenlander as a:

Dead man lying face downwards on the ground. On his head was a hood, well made, and otherwise good clothing of frieze cloth and sealskin. Near him was a sheath-knife, bent and much worn and eaten away [...].

This was the last time any European claimed to have seen any of the Norse Greenlanders dead or alive.

In 1585, the English explorer John Davis passed through Greenland in search of the Northwest Passage and came into contact with Inuit near Nuuk (Godthåb), but found no living Europeans. The whaling ships that occasionally passed by in the 16th and 17th centuries also did not report any signs of the presence of descendants of the Icelandic colony. From 1605 to 1607, the Danish-Norwegian King Christian IV of Denmark financed three expeditions to clarify the fate of the colonists, but they did not find the settlements again.

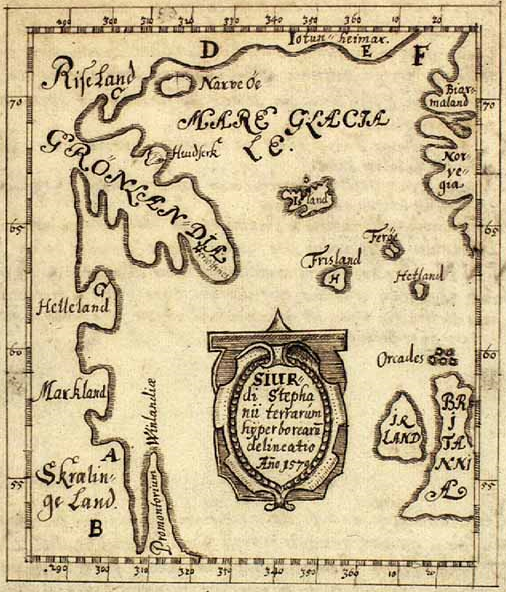
The Skálholt Map showing Latinised Norse place names in the North Atlantic: Iotun-heimar (Jötunheimr); Riseland (Land of the Risi); Grönlandia (Greenland); Helleland (Helluland); Markland; Skrælinge Land (Land of the Skræling); Promontorium Winlandiæ (Promontory of Vinland)

There are various, sometimes controversial, theories for the decline of the Grænlendingar. From today's perspective, it is likely that there was a combination of various unfavourable factors, the interaction of which destabilised society at the time to such an extent that its survival was no longer assured after the 15th century.

=== Political causes ===
- The Thule people, ancestors of modern Inuit, which emerged in Alaska around 900 AD, spread eastwards along the Arctic coast from 1000 onwards, replacing the older Dorset culture. The Paleo-Eskimos living in the far north of Greenland were also affected or displaced by this development after 1100. In the following centuries, the bearers of the Thule culture also opened up the previously uninhabited coasts of Greenland. From around the 15th century, the entire Arctic coast can be considered inhabited. Grænlendingar encounters with Inuit cultures are certain. Conflicts are documented, but the extent and type of relationships with the Inuit are controversial. It is possible that Inuit overran the declining settlements and killed the inhabitants. This is at least assumed for the western settlement, but is no longer considered the sole reason for the abandonment of the Eastern Settlement.
- The decline in trade relations cut off the settlement from the supply of vital raw materials, especially wood and iron. The Greenlanders were unable to fill this gap with their own ships because there was a lack of suitable materials for shipbuilding. This thesis was already questioned in the 1950s, discussing the Hanseatic League stepping in. Archaeologist Niels Lynnerup contradicts this: burial customs were similar to those in Iceland until well into the 15th century. Jette Arneborg points out that clothing fashion followed that of the rest of Northern Europe until the end of settlement, which rules out total isolation.
- The opinion was also expressed that piracy, namely of the Victual Brothers, had led to the murder of the last settlers and plundered the farms. A papal letter from 1448 and other rather dubious sources were cited for this. There is historical evidence that the Vitalien Brothers attacked and robbed the rich and well-defended city of Bergen in 1429; a raid into Greenland would have been less risky, but also less rewarding. There are no written records of such a company. This approach is not being pursued any further today.
- The thesis was also put forward that the settlers had survived and mixed with the Inuit (Fridtjof Nansen). This theory has been refuted through genetic analysis.
- Declining value of ivory in Europe (due to the influx of ivory from Russian walrus and African elephants) may have forced Norse hunters to overkill the walrus populations and endanger their own survival.

=== Deterioration of living conditions ===
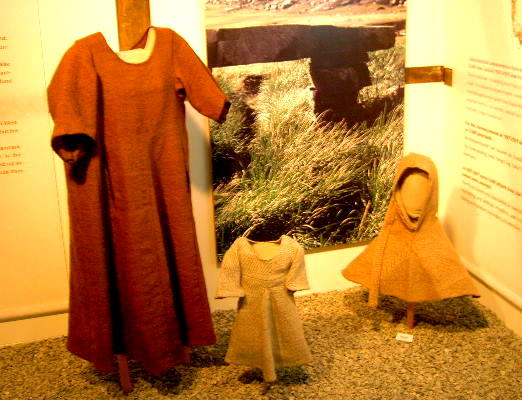
Replica of Grænlendingar clothing

- From the 15th century onwards, climatic conditions deteriorated dramatically. Between 1400 and 1850 there occurred the so-called "Little Ice Age," when temperatures in Greenland were around 0.5 to 1 °C (0.90 to 1.80 °F) lower than today. Such a sharp drop in temperature had fatal effects on a farming society that was always located at the limit of climatic possibilities for existence. Frequent harvest failures and constant famine may have gradually led to the colony's extinction.
  Poul Nørlund's finds in the Herjolfsnes cemetery are revealing in this respect. The skeletons from the late 14th and early 15th centuries are significantly smaller than the older finds unearthed in the Brattahlíð cemetery. The men are seldom taller than 1.60 m (5 ft 3 in), the women on average only 1.40 to 1.50 m (4 ft 7 in to 4 ft 11 in). A higher number of child burials indicates a high child mortality rate. Most skeletons have defects, such as spinal crookedness or narrowing of the pelvis; rachitic symptoms are common. However, the anthropologist Niels Lynnerup rejects the theory of extinction due to malnutrition for lack of sufficient evidence. The archaeologist Jørgen Meldgaard found the remains of a well-stocked pantry and equipment in the western settlement, which do not indicate malnutrition.
- It is argued that the spread of the Eurois occulta moth played a role, although evidence is found only in the farmstead of Anavik, in the Western Settlement.
- The geographer Jared Diamond argues that soil erosion caused by overgrazing, lack of raw materials such as iron and wood, war with the Inuit, and a conservative attitude among the Grænlendingar people prevented them from adopting Inuit techniques (e.g. kayaks, harpoons), and that climate change interacted. It is possible that the bottom lands of the southern fjords were covered by high-grown shrub and surrounded by hills covered with grass and brush (as the Qinngua Valley currently is) during initial landfall in the 980s, but this has not been determined yet. If the presumption is true, then the Norse probably cleared the landscape by felling trees to use as building material and fuel and by allowing their sheep and goats to graze there in both summer and winter. Any resultant soil erosion could have become an important factor in the demise of the colonies, as the land was stripped of its natural cover. Dental analysis of ovicaprids (sheep and goats) from the Western Settlement, for example, also suggest overgrazing.
- Recent research (2022) sees the main cause not as cold, but as increasing drought, so that livestock could no longer be adequately fed and the main source of food was at risk. This is supported by sediment cores from the settlement areas and also relics from irrigation canals. Lack of water fits well with the overgrazing postulated above by Diamond, as it causes pasture areas to become smaller and less productive.
- Further recent research (2023) suggests that the transition from the Medieval Warm Period to the Little Ice Age counterintuitively drove up sea levels in coastal southwestern Greenland by as much as 3.3 metres (11 ft). Comparing a geophysical model to archeological evidence, the scientists hypothesize that advance of the Southern Greenland Ice Sheet caused local sea level to rise through increased gravitational attraction of seawater toward the ice sheet and crustal subsidence. If actual, such a rise would have progressively flooded much of the coast, including the Eastern Settlement.
- From 1402 to 1404 the Black Death hit Iceland for the first time and killed approximately half the population there – but there is no evidence that it reached Greenland. Another epidemic of plague raged in Bergen in 1359 and in Iceland between 1408 and 1414. Since trade with Greenland took place exclusively through Bergen and Trondheim and there was constant contact with Iceland, the Danish-Norwegian historian Ludvig Holberg concluded that the plague also reached Greenland and contributed to the colony's decline. A mass grave was found near Narsarsuaq; It is still unclear whether this can be considered conclusive evidence of an epidemic; the necessary conditions for a plague epidemic to spread were probably lacking.

=== Emigration ===
Archaeological excavations by Danish scientists (2013) revealed that the Grænlendingar people had adapted well to the worsening climate by switching to seal fishing. Seals made up up to 80 percent of their diet. The herds of cattle were replaced by more frugal goats and sheep. The abandonment of the settlements was due to several factors: The abandonment of the traditional way of life in favour of that of the Inuit weakened the identity of the settlers. Walrus teeth and seal skins were hardly in demand anymore; as a result, hardly any merchant ships came to the island with urgently needed timber and iron tools. Many young and strong residents left Greenland until the settlements were finally abandoned, apparently in a planned manner. The Black Death and rural exodus severely depopulated large parts of Iceland and Norway, so that sufficient better settlement land was available for the emigrants. Arneborg also suggests that worsening climatic and economical circumstances caused them to migrate to Iceland or Scandinavia.

== History of discovery and research ==
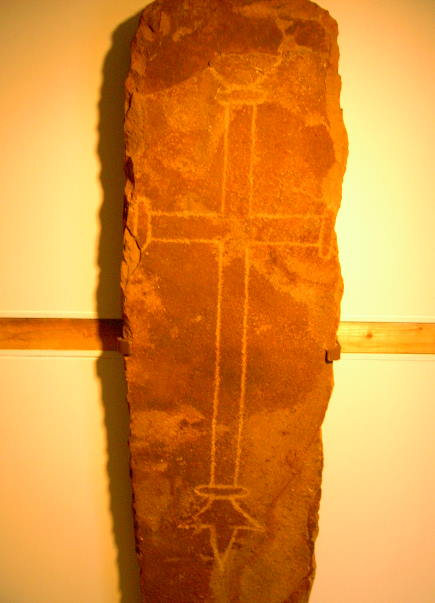
Christian gravestone from the Eastern Settlement

The first tangible evidence of Icelandic settlements in Greenland – in addition to the well-known written evidence – is probably the discovery of the English captain John Davis, who found a gravestone with a Christian cross in the Eastern Settlement in 1586. Further grave and skeleton discoveries by whalers followed.

The memory of the "blond men" in Greenland was never extinguished. In the 16th and 17th centuries there were some half-hearted attempts to communicate with the colony, particularly to bring the Grænlendingar, who were believed to have apostatised, "into the bosom of the Church". The story circulated in Denmark and Norway that the Grænlendingar could no longer bake hosts due to a lack of grain and now supposedly worshipped the cloth that had covered the last host. These attempts failed primarily because the settlements were sought on the east coast of Greenland in a false interpretation of the name Eystribyggð.

When the pastor Hans Egede, who came from the Lofoten Islands, heard about this, he set out to preach to the Christian settlers who, as he thought, had fallen away from the faith. When he anchored in Godthåb in 1721, he found some remains of the Western Settlement without identifying them as such, but no living European. Nevertheless, he stayed in Greenland and instead began proselytising the Inuit. It was only with Gustav Frederik Holm's trips to Julianehåb (Qaqortoq) in 1880 and Daniel Bruhns' investigations at the same site in 1903 that systematic archaeological investigations began. It was also Holm who, with his discovery of Tasiilaq (formerly Amassalik) on the east coast on his women's boat expedition in 1884, conclusively proved that Eystribyggð could not be found there.

In 1921, the Danish government sent an archaeological expedition to Greenland led by Poul Nørlund. He excavated a cemetery at the Herjolfsnes farm and found well-preserved items of clothing that are now part of the National Museum of Denmark in Copenhagen (reconstructions in the Greenland National Museum at Nuuk). He is also credited with the first scientific excavations in Brattahlíð and Garðar as well as in Sandness in the Western Settlement.

From 1940, Leif Verbaek carried out extensive excavations at Vatnahverfi in the Eastern Settlement.

As part of the Nordic Archaeological Expedition in the 1970s, various research into the history of Greenland – both the Grænlendingar and the Inuit cultures – took place.

== See also ==
- Norse settlement of North America
- Vinland
- History of North America
