= Herjólfr Bárðarson =

10th-century Icelandic settler of Greenland

Herjólfr Bárðarson is one of the primary settlers in the History of Greenland.

First he lived in Iceland on Drepstokki. He was the son of Bárð Herjólfsson and married to Þorgerður. His son Bjarni Herjúlfsson was the first European sighting the American continent in 986, after getting off course.

Herjólfr was one of Eiríkur rauði's liegemen, who left Iceland with 25 Viking ships in 985 to settle Greenland. Of these 25 only 14 made it to Greenland, among them Herjólfr's.

According to the Icelandic Landnámabók, his family settled at Herjólfsfjörð on Herjólfsnes peninsula south of Brattahlíð, near modern Narsarmijit (Friedrichsthal) south of Nanortalik.
