= Catholic Church in Greenland =

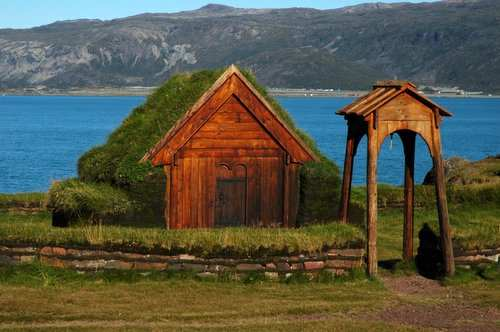
21st-century reproduction of Thjodhild's church, with Tunulliarfik Fjord in the background (then called Eriksfjord), thought to be the first church and chapel in America

The Catholic Church in Greenland is part of the worldwide Catholic Church, under the spiritual leadership of the Pope in Rome. There are very few Catholics in this overwhelmingly Protestant territory. There are 50 registered Catholics and only approximately 4 native Greenlander Catholics out of a population of 57,000. They are part of the only Catholic parish in Greenland, in Nuuk, the island's capital. The whole island is under the jurisdiction of the Diocese of Copenhagen, Denmark.

Catholicism was introduced to Greenland in the 11th century with the help of the King of Norway, establishing the first churches in the Americas, and after much effort the people of Greenland received a bishop. The church thrived with the Norse colony which saw its peak in the 14th century, and had an active relationship with Scandinavia and the European continent; the church also participated in the European exploration of the Americas. The abandonment of the colony around 1450 ended any church presence in Greenland and the Protestant Reformation in Denmark effectively shut Greenland from any Catholic presence until the 20th century, when freedom of religion was declared and a small permanent Catholic presence reestablished.

== History ==
=== Middle Ages ===
Catholicism was introduced to Greenland about 1000 AD. Leif Ericson, son of Eric the Red, visited Nidaros (now Trondheim, Norway) and converted to Christianity while at the court of the Norwegian king. He then returned to his father's farm in Brattahlid, southern Greenland, and brought two priests sent by King Olaf Tryggvason. Some scholars have hypothesized that, like the Catholic diocese in Iceland, Greenland may have had an unofficial bishop first, specifically "Eric the Bishop, who was sent to Greenland in the year 1112 or 1121, though others claim he was a missionary bishop, and there is no record of his return. Eric was supposedly a member of an expedition to re-locate the eastern coast of North America. The settlers were supposedly eager to have a bishop after Eirik failed to arrive, and leading citizen Sokki Thorisson sent his son Einar to the court of the Norwegian king to request a bishop. After Einar brought gifts of ivory, walrus hides, and a "white bear" for the king, the king appointed Arnold, one of his chief clerks, to be Greenland's first bishop. The first diocese, titled Gardar, was officially established in 1124, and Greenland had the first known churches in the new world. In 1152 the diocese of Gardar was made a suffragan to the new Archdiocese of Nidaros in Norway.

At the height of the settlement's extent, there were five thousand Norse Catholics in two settlements. Sixteen parishes and churches were founded along with at least two monasteries and a convent for Benedictine nuns. Churches built in Greenland were not independent properties owned by the church, but were built on farmland given by local farmers and other chief villagers, and collected a part of the tithes given to the church and sent them to the archbishop in Nidaros. Attempts were made in nearby Scandinavian countries to take control of the local churches, and Norway's control of trade with Greenland in 1261 may have put pressure on local churches to become independent, just as they had in Norway.

Bishop Arnes in 1281 contributed to Peter's Pence and the expenses of the Crusades with walrus tusks and polar bear hides, and tithing continued in later years by selling raw materials for gold and silver. The introduction of Christianity is thought to have caused a major cultural break from the past, introducing many mainland European ideas and practices, such as the building of large churches and cathedrals, and this connection was maintained by the fact that the bishops appointed to Greenland were from Scandinavia, and not locals. At least until 1327, the Vatican made an official receipt of six years worth of tithes from Greenland. Sixteen to eighteen bishops held the title of Bishop of Gardar during the diocese history, though few are thought to have actually resided in Greenland. In 1341, the Bishop of Bergen sent a representative named Ivar Bardarson, who returned to Norway with detailed lists of all church properties, which is thought by some to indicate the church was attempting to become more independent in Greenland.

=== Reformation era ===
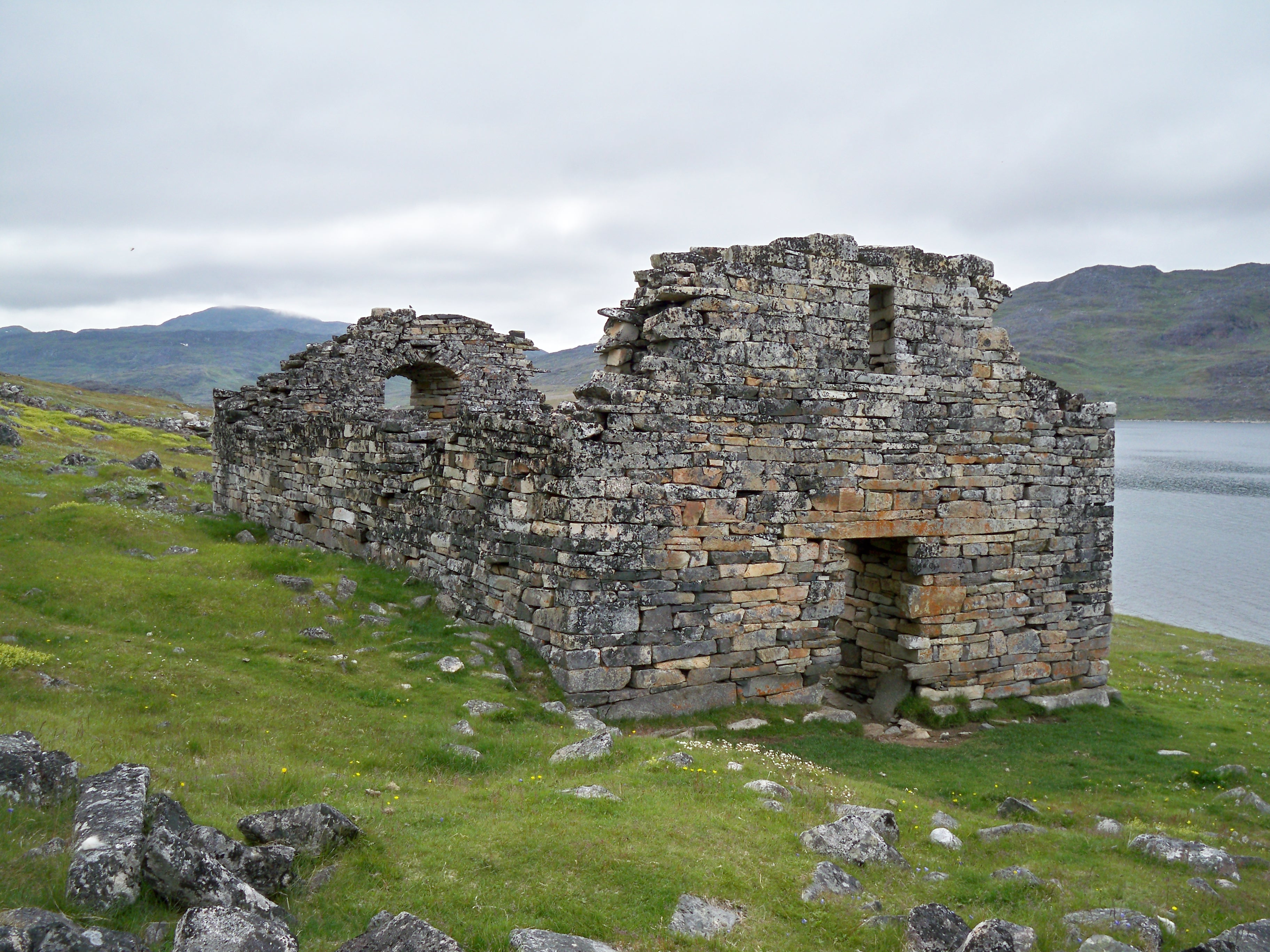
The last written records of the Norse Greenlanders are from a 1408 marriage in Hvalsey Church – today the best-preserved of the Norse ruins.

The Norse colony in Greenland faded out during the 15th century and the church with it. In 1519, Pope Leo X named Vincent Peterson Kampe bishop of Gardar. In a letter sent in that year on 20 June, Kampe was named the bishop "in titulum", and the letter also stated that the diocese itself was vacant because of "the unfaithful". Also on the same date, the Pope stated that Gardar had been deprived of a bishop for 30 years. It is therefore thought by some experts that the bishop was treated as the head of the diocese until 1530, and after that as just a title. When he died in 1530, no further bishops were appointed to the Greenland diocese. For many years, it was thought that the diocese of Gardar was not really occupied by a Catholic bishop, but was a title given to a bishop who may not actually have been in Greenland. After the last Norse colony in North America faded out, the Catholic Archbishop of Trondheim, Eric Walkendorf, attempted to send assistance, but to no avail.

=== Modern times ===
Greenland was part of the "Apostolic Prefecture of the Arctic Pole" based in Norway from 1855 to 1868. Since that time, Greenland has been part of the Danish Catholic Church hierarchy, first the Apostolic Prefecture of Copenhagen, which was raised to a Vicariate Apostolic, and later a full Catholic Diocese. The territory was under the jurisdiction of the Vicar Apostolic of Copenhagen in the early 20th century. Catholic priests have been visiting Greenland since 1930, after the bishop of Copenhagen, Benedictine Theodore Suhr, received permission from the Vatican to ask permission of the Missionary Oblates of Mary Immaculate to missionize there. Catholic priests have also served with the United States military as chaplains in the 20th century. State enforced Lutheranism was kept in place until 1953 when religious liberty was declared. In the summer of 1980, the Little Sisters of Jesus established a fraternity in Nuuk with three sisters. Denmark has requested UNESCO acknowledge the ruins of the episcopal residence at Gardar as part of a World Heritage Site. In 2007, a global environmental summit was held in Nuuk at their Catholic church, which was attended by Catholic, Orthodox and United Nations officials, with the approval of Pope Benedict XVI.

=== Organization ===
Catholics are gathered in the only parish of Christ the King Church (Krist Konge Kirke), dependent on the Diocese of Copenhagen; in the church, consecrated on 11 June 1972, Masses are celebrated in Danish and English. In collaboration with the US military ordinariate, the mission also provides for US Catholics stationed at the military base (Peterson Air Force Base) in Qaanaaq. From 2009-2023 the parish was entrusted to priests of the Institute of the Incarnate Word (IVE). Since 2023 it has been entrusted to the Order of Friars Minor Conventual's Denmark Mission. Since 1980, the Sisters of the Fraternity of the Little Sisters of Jesus (Jesu Små Søstres Kommunitet / Jiisusip Najaarai), in Nuuk, work in the mission.

== See also ==
- Catholic Church by country
