= Christianity in Denmark =

Christianity is a prevalent religion in Denmark; in 2026, 70% of the population of Denmark were members of the Church of Denmark. According to a survey in 2009, 25% of Danes believe Jesus is the son of God, and 18% believe he is the saviour of the world. Aside from Lutheranism, there is a small Catholic minority, as well as small Protestant denominations such as the Baptist Union of Denmark and the Reformed Synod of Denmark.

Denmark has Lutheranism as the state religion, as such its culture is heavily influenced by Christianity.

== Protestantism ==
=== Church of Denmark (Lutheranism) ===
Church of Denmark
year	population	members	percentage
1890	2,205,820	2,138,529	96.9%
1901	2,449,540	2,416,511	98.7%
1911	2,757,076	2,715,187	98.5%
1984	5,113,500	4,684,060	91.6%
1990	5,135,409	4,584,450	89.3%
2000	5,330,500	4,536,422	85.1%
2005	5,413,600	4,498,703	83.3%
2010	5,534,738	4,479,214	80.9%
2011	5,560,628	4,469,109	80.4%
2012	5,580,516	4,454,466	79.8%
2013	5,602,628	4,430,643	79.1%
2014	5,627,235	4,413,825	78.4%
2015	5,659,715	4,400,754	77.8%
2016	5.707.251	4.387.571	76,9%
2017	5.748.769	4.361.518	75.9%
2018	5.781.190	4.352.507	75,3%
2019	5.806.081	4.339.511	74.7%
2020	5.822.763	4.327.018	74.3%
2021	5.840.045	4.311.333	73.8%
2022	5.873.420	4.296.800	73.2%
2023	5.932.654	4.276.271	72.1%
2024	5.961.249	4.253.575	71.4%
2025	5.992.734	4.234.315	70.7%
2026	6.025.603	4.217.476	70.0%

Statistical data: 1984, 1990–2026 Source: Kirkeministeriet

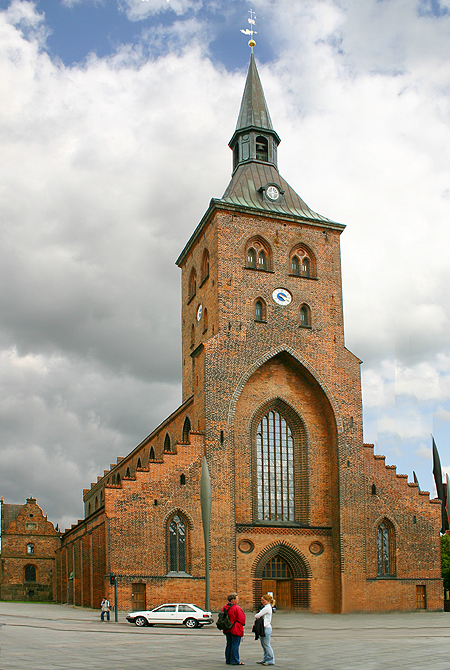
St. Canute's Cathedral, Odense

According to official statistics from 2026, 70% of the population of Denmark are members of the Evangelical Lutheran Church of Denmark (Den danske folkekirke), the country's state church since the Reformation in Denmark–Norway and Holstein, and designated "the Danish people's church" by the 1848 Constitution of Denmark.

This proportion is down by 0.7% as compared to the preceding year and 1.4% down compared to two years earlier. However, in similar fashion to the rest of Scandinavia, and also Britain, only a small minority (less than 5% of the total population) attends churches for Sunday services. In addition, the number of people leaving the Church has been on the rise: in 2012, 21,118 Danes left the Church, an increase of 55% in comparison to 2011. Individuals automatically become members when baptized, as most people born in Denmark are at birth, and cannot leave of their own accord until they are 18 years old. Members are not informed of their membership or their ability to leave. Further, there are no standard formulas for leaving the church; one must personally contact the priest or office of one's parish.

=== Other Protestant denominations ===
A small Baptist community has existed since the 1840s and is represented by the Baptist Union of Denmark. The Union claimed 55 churches and 5,412 congregants in 2011.

Reformed Protestantism is represented by four churches united in the Reformed Synod of Denmark. These are mainly ethnic congregations, including two Huguenot churches and a German Reformed church, founded in the seventeenth and eighteenth centuries, as well as the Korean Reformed Church founded in 1989. The German Reformed church also includes some Dutch, Swiss, Hungarian and American members, as well as Danes. There is an Anglican church and fellowship in Copenhagen and smaller congregations of Anglicans and Episcopalians in many Danish cities.

A 2015 study estimates some 4,000 Christian believers from a Muslim background in the country, most of them belonging to some form of Protestantism.

== Catholicism ==
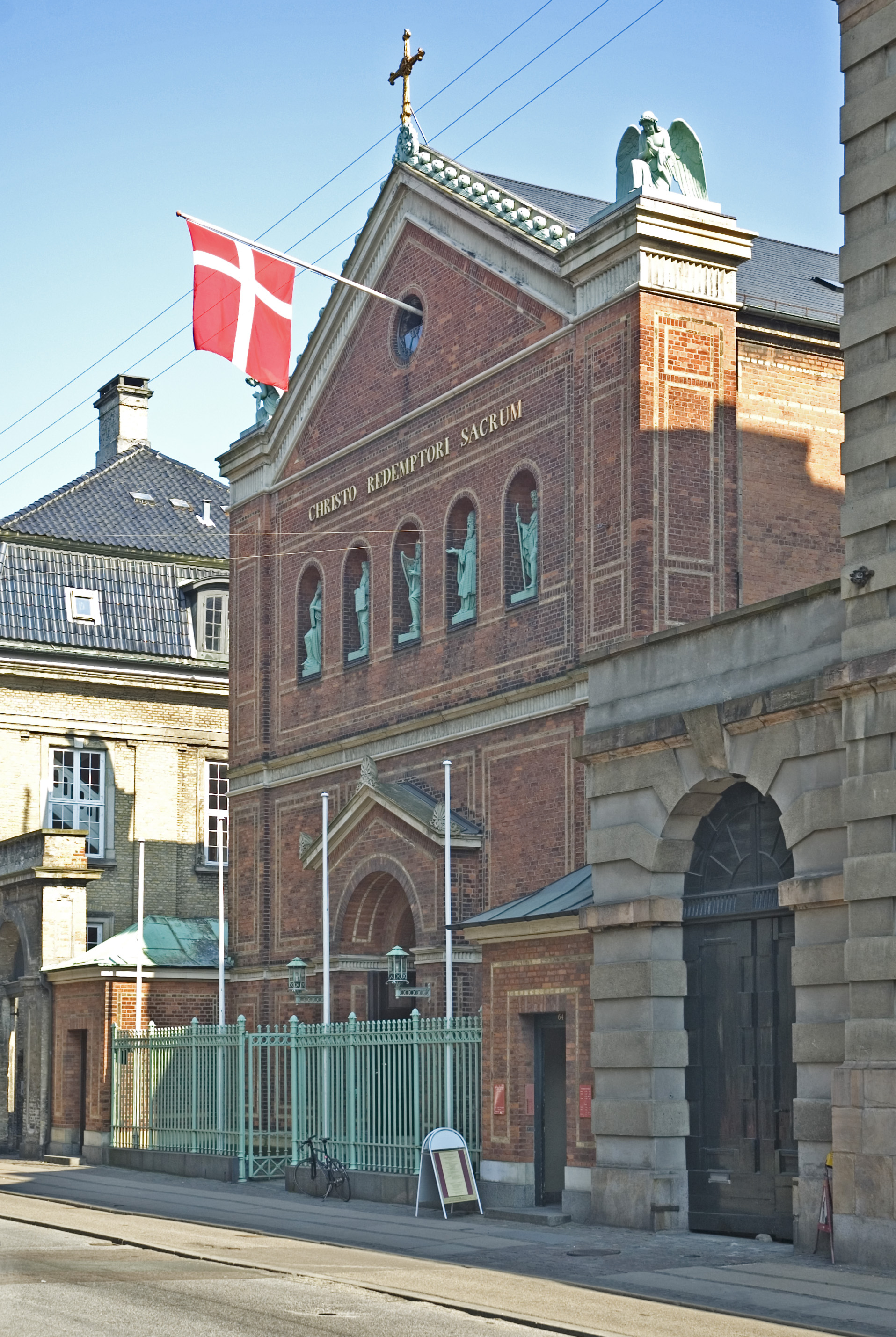
St. Ansgar's Cathedral, Copenhagen

After the separation of the Church of Denmark from the Catholic Church in 1536, the Catholic Church remained illegal in the country for over three centuries. The Church was able to reestablish itself after the Constitution of 1849 granted religious freedom to the Kingdom. Currently the country is covered by the Diocese of Copenhagen with 48 parishes in Denmark proper and two more in the Faeroe Islands and Greenland. There are nearly 40,000 Catholics in Denmark, though nearly a third are foreign born and others are born of foreign parents (for example, Denmark's Polish community, of which the current bishop of the Roman-Catholic Diocese of Copenhagen, Czeslaw Kozon, is a member). Nevertheless, ethnic Danes are still the largest group among the Church's congregants.

== Orthodoxy ==
=== Eastern Orthodoxy ===
Adherents of Eastern Orthodox Christianity in Denmark are traditionally organized in accordance with patrimonial ecclesiastical jurisdictions. Eastern Orthodox Danes of Greek origin belong to the Metropolis of Sweden and Scandinavia, under the Ecumenical Patriarchate of Constantinople. Those of Russian origin are directly under the Patriarch of the Russian Orthodox Church. Those of Serbian origin belong to the Serbian Orthodox Eparchy of Britain and Scandinavia. Those of Romanian origin belong to the Diocese of Northern Europe, of the Romanian Orthodox Church.

=== Oriental Orthodoxy ===
Adherents of Oriental Orthodox Christianity in Denmark are also traditionally organized in accordance with their patrimonial ecclesiastical jurisdictions, each community having its own parishes and priests. Oriental Orthodox Danes of Armenian origin belong to the Armenian Apostolic Church. Those of Coptic origin belong to the Coptic Orthodox Diocese of Stockholm and Scandinavia.

== Restorationism ==
=== The Church of Jesus Christ of Latter-day Saints ===
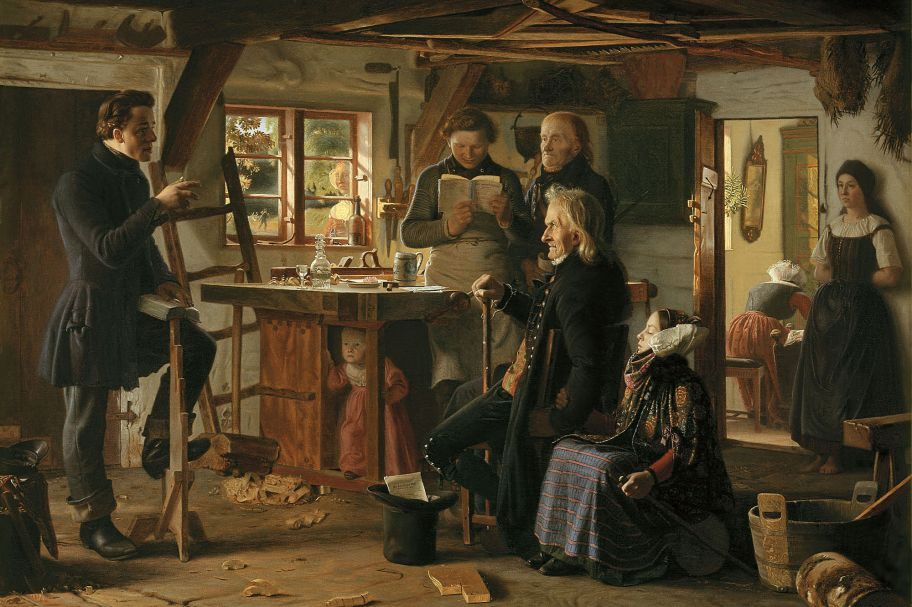
"Visiting a country carpenter" (1856) by Christen Dalsgaard, depicting a mid-19th century visit of a Missionary from the Church of Jesus Christ of Latter-day Saints to a Danish carpenter's workshop. The first missionaries from the faith arrived in Denmark in 1850.

The Church of Jesus Christ of Latter-day Saints has been sending missionaries to Denmark since 14 June 1850. Most of the early converts emigrated to the United States. There are currently over 4,500 members of the church in Denmark. There is a Temple in Copenhagen, known as the Copenhagen Denmark Temple.

== See also ==
- Church of Denmark or Den Danske Folkekirke.
- Christianization of Scandinavia
