= Catholic Church in Denmark =

- Danish: Katolske kirke i Danmark
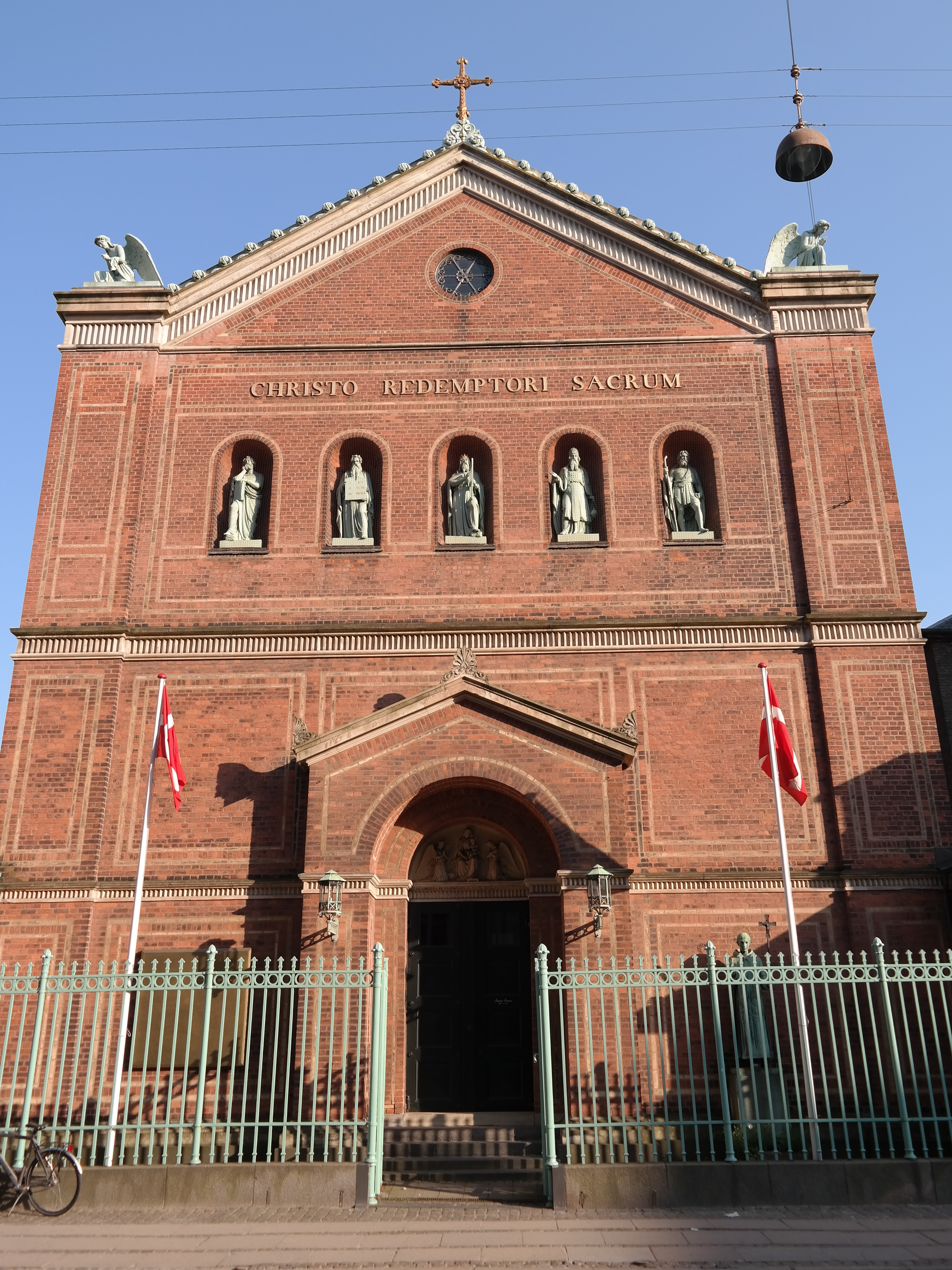
- St. Ansgar's Cathedral, Copenhagen
- Type: National polity
- Classification: Catholic
- Orientation: Latin
- Scripture: Bible
- Theology: Catholic theology
- Polity: Episcopal
- Governance: Nordic Bishops' Conference
- Pope: Leo XIV
- Bishop of Copenhagen: Czeslaw Kozon
- Region: Denmark
- Language: Danish, Faroese, Greenlandic, Latin
- Headquarters: Copenhagen, Denmark
- Members: 58,000 (December 2024)
- Official website: The Catholic Church in Denmark

The Catholic Church in Denmark (Danish: Den Katolske kirke i Danmark) is part of the worldwide Catholic Church, under the spiritual leadership of the Pope in Rome. The Diocese of Copenhagen covers the whole of the country, as well as the Faroe Islands and Greenland, and as such is one of the geographically largest Catholic dioceses by area in the world.

Catholicism was the state religion of Denmark from around the 10th century until the Reformation in Denmark when Catholicism was banned. Full religious freedom was introduced through the Constitution of 1849, allowing the Church to re-emerge. As of 2024, the number of Catholics in Denmark, a predominantly Lutheran country, is increasing, although it accounts for less than 1% of the population.

== History ==
=== Christianization ===
The first recorded Christian missionary to preach in Denmark was Willibrord, who around 710 unsuccessfully attempted to convert King Ongendus. In 831, Pope Gregory IV appointed Ansgar to oversee the mission in the Nordics. He was designated a papal legate and the archbishop of the newly created Archbishopric of Hamburg. Danish vikings sacked Hamburg in 845, forcing Ansgar to flee to Bremen. The seat of the archbishopric moved with him and the Archbishopric of Hamburg-Bremen was then responsible for the church's mission in the Nordic region for the next 150 years. Ansgar died in 865. Within his lifetime he managed to establish but two churches in Denmark: one in Hedeby and the other in Ribe. It is difficult to determine whether his efforts made a lasting impact on the Christianization of Denmark, given their strong and at times violent rejection by Medieval vikings.

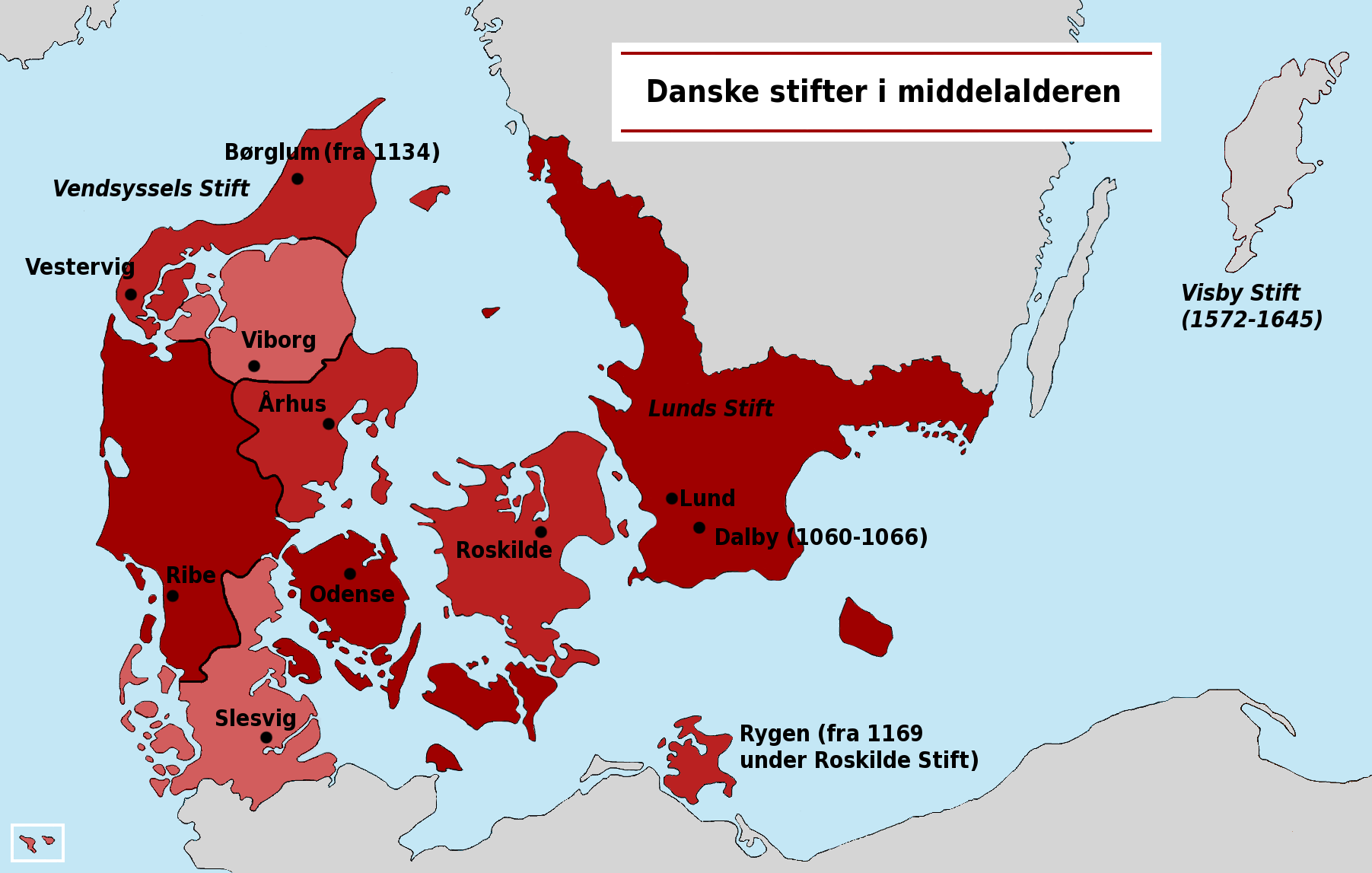
Map of Catholic dioceses in Denmark during the Middle Ages, showing the ancient dioceses of Aarhus, Børglum, Lund, Odense, Ribe, Roskilde, Schleswig, and Viborg.

Christianity began to spread in Denmark in the mid-10th century. Mission dioceses were established in Jutland around 948. Legend has it that in 960, a missionary named Poppa or Poppo converted Harald Bluetooth after holding red-hot iron without being burned. However, Harald did not officially convert to Catholicism until after a peace agreement with the Holy Roman Empire. A diocese was established in Odense around 965. Around 1022, Roskilde became the episcopal seat of Zealand and in 1060 Lund became the episcopal seat of Skåneland. Bishop Adalbert of Hamburg-Bremen divided the kingdom between eight dioceses, which remained unchanged until the 19th century.

Canute IV, who reigned from 1080 to 1086, strongly supported the bishopric of Lund. Under the reign of Canute's brother, Eric I, Lund became the seat of a new archbishopric for the Nordic region, independent from the bishop of Hamburg-Bremen. In 1152 Norway received its own independent diocese, followed by Sweden in 1164, making the Diocese of Lund the seat of the Catholic Church in Denmark. The 12th century saw a number of monastic orders established in Denmark, namely Benedictines, Cistercians, Premonstratensians, Augustinians, and Johannites. Franciscan and Dominican orders were established in the 13th century. The reign of Margaret I saw the establishment of orders of Carmelites and Bridgettines. Pope Sixtus IV gave Denmark permission to establish its own university in Copenhagen in 1479.

The period between the mid-10th century and the late 11th saw wooden churches erected across the kingdom. In the late 11th and 12th centuries many of these structures were replaced with stone churches. A large number of churches were erected in the 15th century, which are characterised by brightly colored frescoes.

=== Protestant Reformation ===
Beginning in 1526, Christian congregations without ties to the Catholic Church began to form in Denmark, predominantly in larger cities. Through the Count's Feud, Christian III came to power in 1536 and implemented the Reformation across the Kingdom. As a result, all of the Catholic Church's properties were seized by the crown, including its monasteries and churches. On 12 August 1536, all the Catholic bishops in Denmark were arrested by order of Christian III. The crown installed new bishops, titled as superintendents, to replace the leadership of the former catholic dioceses, but on a local level church life typically remained the same and most parish priests maintained their positions.

Catholicism was forbidden in Denmark and the presence of foreign Catholics in Denmark and Norway was de facto criminalized in 1569. Anti-catholic legislation was introduced on several occasions, including in the Danske Lov of 1683. Danish subjects were forbidden to study at Jesuit schools abroad and risked banishment if they converted to Catholicism. With the exception of the free towns of Fredericia and Friedrichstadt—where religious freedom was established for Jews, Catholics, and Calvinists for economic reasons—no non-Lutheran religious community was established in Denmark before the freedom of religion was introduced in 1849. However, foreign dignitaries were allowed to conduct private church services in their homes, which were in principle only to be attended by their own household. This exception was first granted to the French ambassador in 1671, and introduced as a general rule in the Danske Lov of 1683. In the 18th century, the Austrian Embassy used this rule to function as a church for a small population of local Catholics, primarily foreign soldiers, officers, and courtiers.

In 1622, Pope Gregory XV established the Congregation for the Propagation of the Faith. The body was given jurisdiction over former Catholic regions, including the Nordic states, with the intention of re-establishing Catholicism in the region. In 1667, an Apostolic Vicariate was established to specifically oversee this campaign in the Nordic region. Although Catholicism was still suppressed in Denmark, Catholics were granted the freedom to organize in the Danish West Indies in 1754. This exception was likely granted because the majority of the colony's population were not of Danish origins. By 1840, the number of Catholics in the Danish West Indies exceeded 12,000.

=== Re-establishment ===
The constitution of 1849 provided for religious freedom and the Catholic Church was again allowed to spread in Denmark. In 1850 there were approximately 1,000 Catholics in Denmark. Initially, the reestablished Catholic Church in Denmark was within the Nordic vicariate, overseen by the bishop of Osnabrück. In 1868, Denmark was elevated to an independent apostolic prefecture and the parish priest of St. Ansgar's Cathedral, Hermann Grüder (1828–1883) was appointed as prefect by the Vatican. At the time, there were two Catholic parishes in Denmark, the first in Copenhagen and the second in Fredericia. Six new parishes were created in the late 19th century: the parish of Odense and Randers in 1867, Horsens in 1872, Aarhus in 1873, Kolding in 1882, and Svendborg in 1883. In Grüder's time as prefect the number of Catholics in Denmark grew from 1,000 to approximately 3,000.

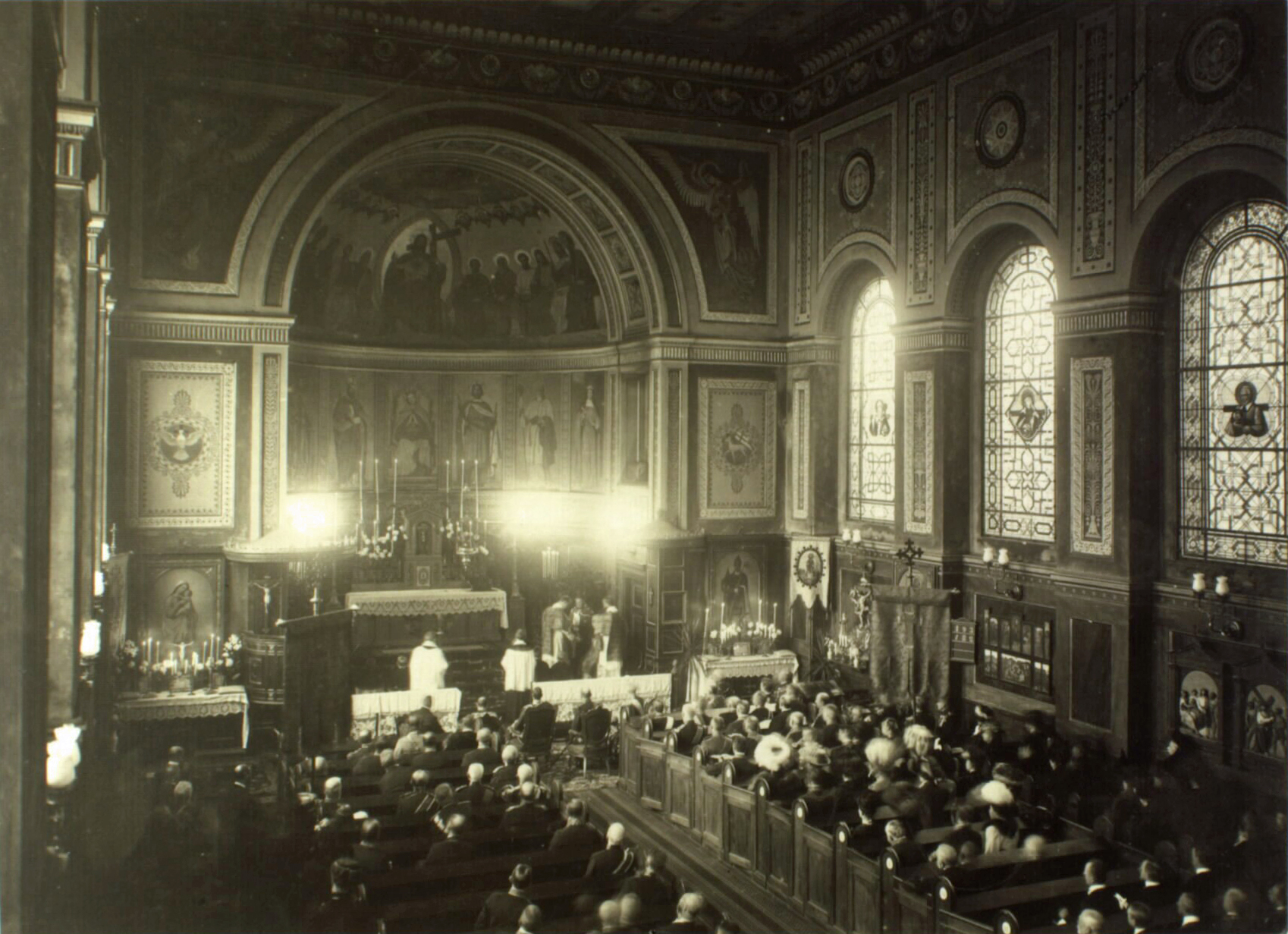
Mass being held at St. Ansgar's Cathedral on 2 December 1908.

Denmark was elevated to an apostolic vicariate in 1892. This meant that Denmark again had its own bishop, Johannes von Euch (1834–1922). During von Euch's tenure as bishop, the number of parishes increased from 8 to 28, while religious communities of Redemptorists, Montfortians, Camillians, and Jesuits, among others, were established. By the 1920s there were 16 Catholic hospitals, 35 parishes, and around 30 schools in Denmark.

By the early 1930s the number of Catholics in Denmark had increased to about 25,000. Although Catholic immigrants contributed to this increase, the majority of this number was due to conversion. Between 200 and 300 Danes converted to Catholicism each year in Denmark around the turn of the 20th century. The majority of these converts were from the working class. Because the majority of Catholic congregations in Denmark were composed of converts, mass was at times made more accessible to those familiar with Protestant services. For example, many Catholic churches allowed hymns to be sung in Danish, rather than in Latin. Because of the strong association between Grundtvig and Danish identity, Danish Catholicism is strongly influenced by Grundtvigianism, despite the later being a Protestant movement.

=== Contemporary history ===
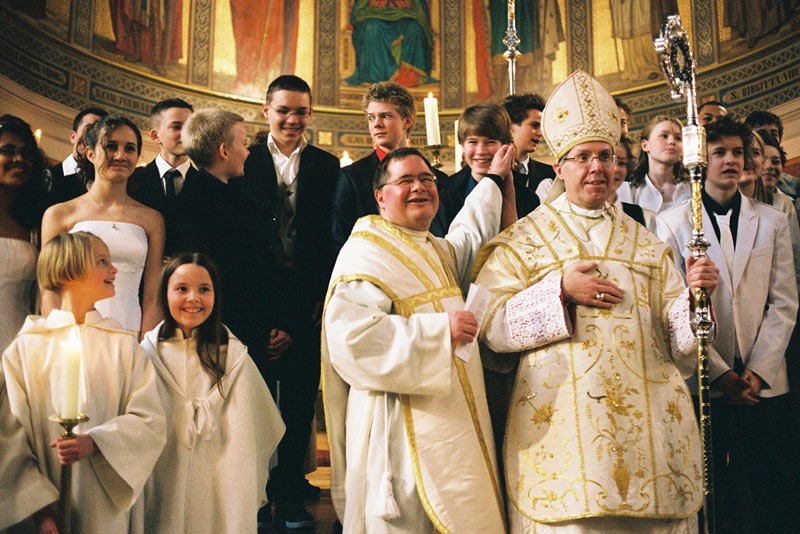
The current bishop of Copenhagen, Czeslaw Kozon (right), after mass at St. Ansgar's Cathedral, 2008.

Initially, the re-established Catholic Church in Denmark had been met with resistance and Anti-Catholicism, but by the mid-20th century the church was largely accepted within Denmark. Conversion, however, had begun to stagnate, averaging approximately 170 converts annually. In 1953, the Apostolic Vicariate of Denmark was elevated to become the Diocese of Copenhagen. In Denmark the reforms following the Second Vatican Council caused many Danes to leave the Catholic Church. Their departure was somewhat mitigated by an increase in Catholic immigrants. The resulting demographic shift has meant that the Catholic Church in Denmark since the 1950s has become a diverse religious community. Today, a large portion of Catholics in Denmark are immigrants or the descendants of immigrants, particularly Poles, Tamils, Vietnamese boat people, and Central Africans.

On 22 January 2021, Cardinal Jean-Claude Hollerich denounced a proposed Danish law that would require translation of all sermons into the Danish language. Though Catholics believe that the proposed regulation is aimed primarily at Muslims, the Danish bishops have said that its passage will chill religious freedom for all, and place a burden on the church, which celebrates Mass in at least 9 languages nationwide.

== Organization ==
The highest office in the Catholic Church in Denmark has since 1995 been held by bishop Czeslaw Kozon, who participates in the Scandinavian Bishops Conference. Bishop Czeslaw Kozon resides in St. Ansgar's Cathedral, Copenhagen, which is dedicated to the patron saint of Denmark.

== List of churches ==
List of Catholic churches within the Kingdom of Denmark, including Greenland and the Faroe Islands:

- St. Anne's Church, Copenhagen
- St. Ansgar's Cathedral, Copenhagen
- St. Augustine's Church, Copenhagen
- Church of Jesus' Heart, Copenhagen
- St. Nicholas' Church, Esbjerg
- St. Knud's Church, Fredericia
- St. Mariæ Church, Frederiksberg
- St. Andrew's Church, Gentofte Municipality
- St. Theresa's Church, Gentofte Municipality
- St. Marie Church, Haderslev
- St. Vincent Church, Helsingør
- St. Antoni Church, Herlev
- Our Lady Church, Herlev
- St. Peter's Church, Herning
- St. Vilhelm's Church, Hillerød
- St. Nikolaj Church, Hvidovre
- St. Elisabeth's Church, Hølbæk
- St. Joseph's Church, Horsens
- St. Mariæ Church, Kalundborg
- St. Michael's Church, Kolding
- St. Hans' Church, Køge
- St. Knud Lavard Church, Lyngby
- Christ the King Church, Nuuk
- Holy Cross Church, Nykøbing Falster
- Our Lady Church, Næstved
- Sakramentskirken, Nørrebro
- St. Alban's Church, Odense
- Church of Jesus' Heart, Randers
- St. Knud's Church, Ringsted
- St. Laurentii Church, Roskilde
- Our Lady Church, Silkeborg
- Our Lady Church, Slagelse
- St. Knud's Church, Svendborg
- St. Paul's Church, Sønderborg
- St. Mary's Church, Tórshavn
- Holy Cross Church, Tønder
- St. Paul's Church, Taastrup
- St. Norbert's Church, Vejle
- St. Kjeld's Church, Viborg
- Immaculatakirken, Østerbro
- St. Ansgar's Church, Aabenraa
- St. Mariæ Church, Aalborg
- Church of Our Lady, Aarhus
- St. Nicholas Church, Aarhus

== List of Danish saints ==
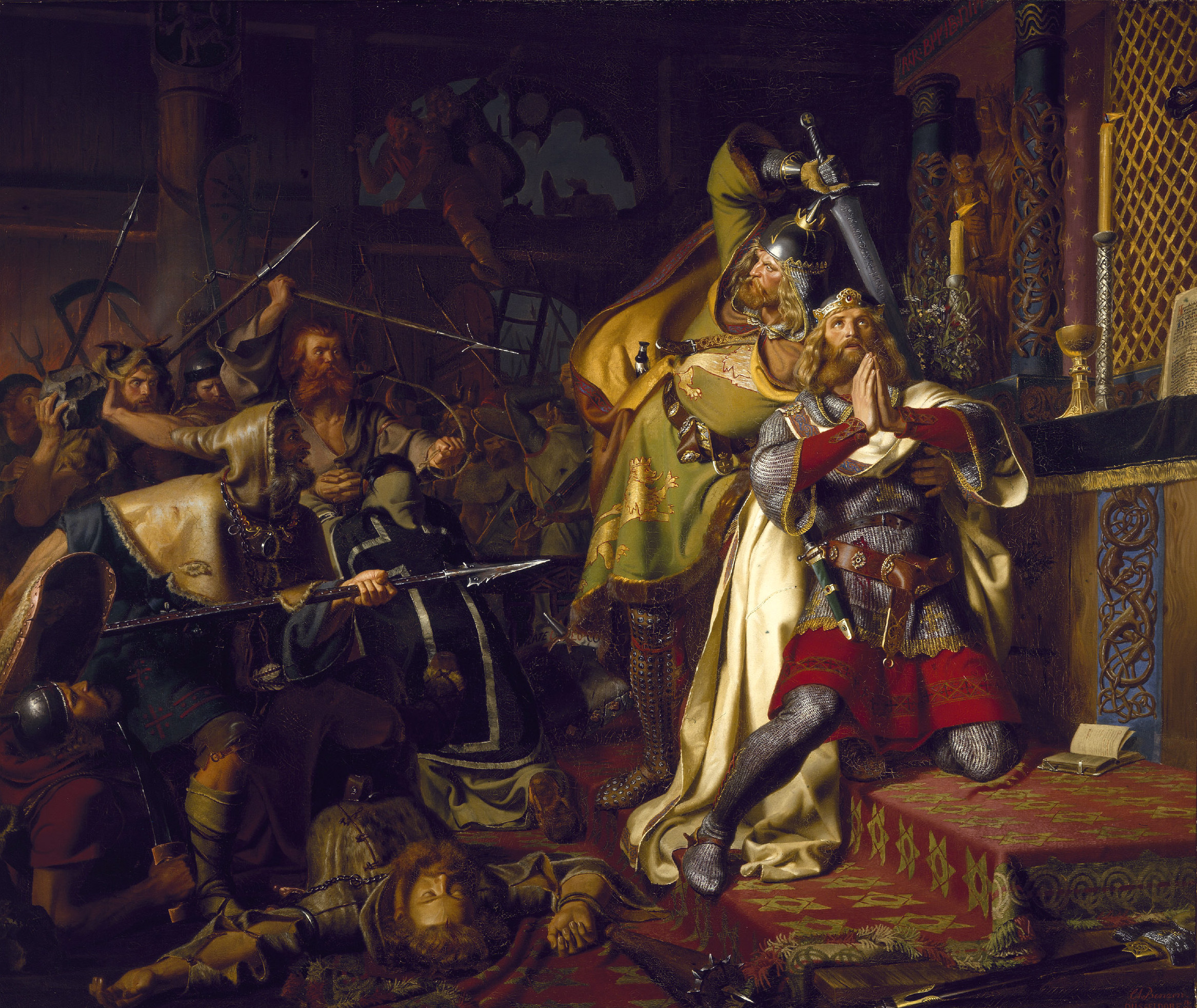
The death of Canute IV of Denmark in the Church of Saint Albanus (1086), Christian Albrecht von Benzon, 1843.

List of canonised Danish saints within the Catholic Church:

- Saint Canute (Knud IV den Hellige)
- Nicolas Steno (Niels Steensen)
- Charles the Good (Karl den Danske)
- Willehad of Denmark (Villehad af Danmark)
- Canute Lavard (Knud Lavard)
- Saint Kjeld
- William of Roskilde (Vilhelm af Roskilde)
- William of Æbelholt (Abbed Vilhelm)

== See also ==
- Religion in Denmark
- Christianity in Denmark
- Roman Catholic Diocese of Copenhagen
