= Garðar =

Garðar (Old Norse pronunciation: [ˈɡɑrðɑz̠]; Icelandic pronunciation: [ˈkarðar̥]; also spelled Gardar) is an Old Norse word meaning "strongholds", "enclosures" or "settlements". It may refer to: also means Garðar in Icelandic

== Places and jurisdictions ==
In the meaning "strongholds":

- Garðaríki, modern territory of Belarus, western Russia and Ukraine.

In the meaning "settlements":

- Garðar, Greenland, a Norse settlement and titular see
- Gardar, North Dakota, an unincorporated community in the US, built up chiefly by Icelanders

== Persons ==
- Garðar Árnason (born 1938), Icelandic footballer
- Garðar Thór Cortes (born 1974), Icelandic tenor
- Gardar Eide Einarsson (born 1976), Norwegian-born artist
- Garðar Gunnlaugsson (born 1983), Icelandic football forward
- Garðar Jóhannsson (born 1980), Icelandic football striker
- Garðar Svavarsson (fl. 860s), Swede who was the first Scandinavian to live on Iceland

== See also ==
- Homo gardarensis, a paleontological false type of man named after the above Greenland town
- Garðarsson
