= Danish Church (disambiguation) =

The Church of Denmark, officially Evangelical Lutheran Church in Denmark or National Church.

Danish Church may also refer to:

- Catholic Church in Denmark
- Danish Seamen's Church and Church Abroad
- Baptist Union of Denmark
- Reformed Synod of Denmark
