= List of Catholic dioceses in Denmark =

The Catholic church in Denmark (where the state church is Lutheran) and its overseas territories has no ecclesiastical province nor belongs to any (all sees being exempt, i.e. directly subject to the Holy See), nor has a national episcopal conference, but the -entirely Latin- Danish episcopate participates in the Episcopal conference of Scandinavia. It comprises only :

- the only proper see, a full bishopric in the national capital
- two missionary pre-diocesan territorial prelatures.

The Eastern Catholics are pastorally served by a transnational apostolic exarchate from Germany.

There formally is also an Apostolic Nunciature to Denmark, as papal embassy-level diplomatic representation. However, it is vested in the Apostolic Nunciature to Sweden (in Djursholm), as are the nunciatures to Norway, Finland and Iceland, covering the Nordic countries.

== Current jurisdictions ==
=== Latin jurisdiction ===
- Diocese of Copenhagen (København), which also covers overseas the Faroe Islands (European Atlantic) and Greenland (North America)

=== Eastern Catholic jurisdiction ===
Ukrainian Greek Catholic Church (Byzantine rite in Ukrainian language)

- Ukrainian Catholic Apostolic Exarchate in Germany and Scandinavia, also covering Germany (with the see in Münich), Finland, Norway and Sweden

== Defunct jurisdictions ==
(all Latin)

=== Titular sees ===
Titular bishoprics only

in Denmark proper

- Diocese of Roskilde (suppressed again, even as titular bishopric)

overseas

- Diocese of Gardar (Garðar) on Greenland

=== Other Pre-Reformation ===
Denmark proper

- Diocese of Aarhus (Århus)
- Diocese of Børglum
- Diocese of Odense
- Diocese of Ribe
- Diocese of Schleswig (mainly in present Germany; absorbed by Osnabrück)
- Diocese of Viborg (Vestervig)

overseas territories

- Ancient Diocese of the Faroe Islands

=== Post-Reformation ===
Only direct precursors of the current sees.

== See also ==
- list of Catholic dioceses (structured view)

== Sources and external links ==
- GCatholic - data for all sections
