= Diocese of Balecium =

Catholic titular see, suppressed diocese

The Roman Catholic Diocese of Balecium (Latin name) or of Balecio/Balezo (in Curiate/Venetian Italian) or of Baleč (in Serbian) is a former Latin Rite bishopric and present titular see of the Catholic Church in Albania. The town that was its seat was destroyed in 1356 by the Serbian kingdom.

== History ==
Circa 1300 (possibly much earlier) was established a Diocese of Balecium alias Balezo.

At the beginning of the 14th century, Baleč (alias Baleš) was the see of a small Catholic diocese. In 1356, Bishop Andreas Citer complained that his bishopric was full of schismatics. The diocese had been laid waste and impoverished by Serbian "schismatics of the kingdom of Rascia", who had completely destroyed the monastery situated 5000 paces from the cathedral. In response, Pope Innocent VI granted him in commendam, on 26 September of the same year, the Benedictine monastery of St. John in Drivast. At this time Baleč must have ceased to exist as a town, so that, although bishops continued to be appointed to the see, by 1448, when even the fortress rebuilt by Skanderbeg was destroyed, the town was no more than a memory.

In the late 15th century the bishopric was formally suppressed after its see had been utterly destroyed.

=== Residential suffragan bishops ===
(all Roman Rite)

- ...
- Gulielmus alias Guglielmo
- Gerwicus de Grünberg, Friars Minor (O.F.M.) (5 March 1347 – 1350)
- Andreas Citer, O.F.M. (1 June 1351 – ?)
- ...
- Ioannes alias Giovanni (?–?)
- ...
- Alfonso da Caceres, O.F.M. (27 March 1420 – ?)
- Domenico Godani (4 June 1422 – ?)
- Michele Paoli (1424.09.01 – 1428.10.11), later Bishop of Drivasto (1428.10.11 – death 1445?)
- Bernardo da Viviers, O.F.M. (3 November 1428 – c. 1459)
- Leonardo da Napoli, Dominican Order (O.P.) (1459.08.31 – ?)
- Leonardo (? – 1488.07.30), later Bishop of Lesina (1488.07.30 – ?)

== Titular see ==
The bishopric of Balecium, no longer a residential see, is today listed by the Catholic Church as a titular see since it was nominally restored as Latin titular bishopric under the names Balecium (Latin; adjective Balcien(sis) ) or Balecio (Curiate Italian).

It has had the following incumbents, so far of the fitting episcopal (lowest) rank :

1. Johannes Theodor Suhr, Benedictine Order (O.S.B.) (1938.12.13 – 1953.04.29) as last Apostolic Vicar of Denmark (Denmark) (1938.12.13 – 1953.04.29); later promoted first Bishop of København (Copenhagen, Denmark) (1953.04.29 – 1964.10.06), emeritate as Titular Bishop of Apisa maius (1964.10.06 – resigned 1976.06.16), died 1979; previously Prior of Abbey of St. Jerome for the Revision and Emendation of the Vulgate (1935 – 1938.12.13)
2. Agostino Baroni, Comboni Missionaries (M.C.C.J.) (Italian) (1953.06.29 – 1974.12.12) as last Apostolic Vicar of Khartoum (Sudan) (1953.06.29 – 1974.12.12); later promoted first Metropolitan Archbishop of Khartoum (Sudan) (1974.12.12 – resigned 1981.10.10), Apostolic Administrator of Rumbek ((now South) Sudan) (1982 – retired 1983), died 2001
3. Amaury Castanho (1976.07.19 – 1979.11.30) as Auxiliary Bishop of Diocese of Sorocaba (Brazil) (1976.07.19 – 1979.11.30), Bishop of Valença (Brazil) (1979.11.30 – 1989.05.03), Coadjutor Bishop of Jundiaí (Brazil) (1989.05.03 – 1996.10.02) succeeding as Bishop of Jundiaí (1996.10.02 – retired 2004.01.07); died 2006
4. Claude Feidt (1980.07.05 – 1985.02.16) as Auxiliary Bishop of Archdiocese of Chambéry–Saint-Jean-de-Maurienne–Tarentaise (France) (1980.07.05 – 1985.02.16); later promoted Coadjutor Archbishop of Chambéry–Saint-Jean-de-Maurienne–Tarentaise (1985.02.16 – 1985.05.14), succeeding as Metropolitan Archbishop of Chambéry–Saint-Jean-de-Maurienne–Tarentaise (1985.05.14 – 1999.06.17), next last Metropolitan Archbishop of Aix(-en-Provence) (France) (1999.06.17 – 2002.12.08), see demoted Archbishop of Aix (2002.12.08 – retired 2010.03.29)
5. Peter Kang U-il (강우일 베드로) (1985.12.21 – 2002.07.20) as Auxiliary Bishop of Archdiocese of Seoul 서울 (South Korea) (1985.12.21 – 2002.07.20); later Bishop of Jeju 제주 (South Korea) (2002.07.20 – ...), President of Catholic Bishops’ Conference of Korea (2008.10.16 – 2014.10.30)
6. Franz Lackner, Friars Minor (O.F.M.) (2002.10.23 – 2013.11.18) as Auxiliary Bishop of Diocese of Graz–Seckau (Austria) (2002.10.23 – 2013.11.18); later Metropolitan Archbishop of Salzburg (primatial see of Austria) (2013.11.18 – ...)
7. Herwig Gössl (24 January 2014 – ...), Auxiliary Bishop of Bamberg (Germany), no previous prelature.

== See also ==
- List of Catholic dioceses in Albania

== Sources and external links ==
- GCatholic with incumbent bio links - data for all sections

Bibliography

- Oliver Jens Schmitt, Das venezianische Albanien (1392-1479), pp. 96–97
- Pius Bonifacius Gams, Series episcoporum Ecclesiae Catholicae, Leipzig 1931, pp. 395–396
- Konrad Eubel, Hierarchia Catholica Medii Aevi, vol. 1, pp. 125–126; vol. 2, p. 101
