= Homo gardarensis =

Homo gardarensis (Gardarene Man) was the name mistakenly given to partial remains found in a burial at Garðar, Greenland in a 12th-century Norse settlement. Original statements compared the remains to Homo heidelbergensis but this identification was subsequently disproven. The bones were classified as the remains of a contemporary human with acromegaly, and put away at Panum Institute in Copenhagen.

== Discovery ==
In 1927 an archaeological dig by the Museum of Copenhagen investigated Garðar. During the excavation of the Garðar Cathedral Ruins, a large jawbone was found, as well as a large skull fragment. These were sent to the laboratory of Professor F. C. C. Hansen in early 1927. He believed that the bones were that of a 40 or 50-year-old Norseman who had reverted to type. He published a preliminary account in the newspaper Berlingske in 1929.

== Reaction ==
Sir Arthur Keith devoted a chapter in his 1931 work New Discoveries Relating to the Antiquity of Man to the discovery. He concluded that the skull represented an acromegalic person, after comparing photographs of the skull with skulls from known acromegalics like Charles Byrne, as well as the La Chapelle skull and Rhodesian skull.
