= Church of Jesus' Heart =

Coordinates: 55.6731°N 12.5575°E

- Jesu Hjerte Kirke
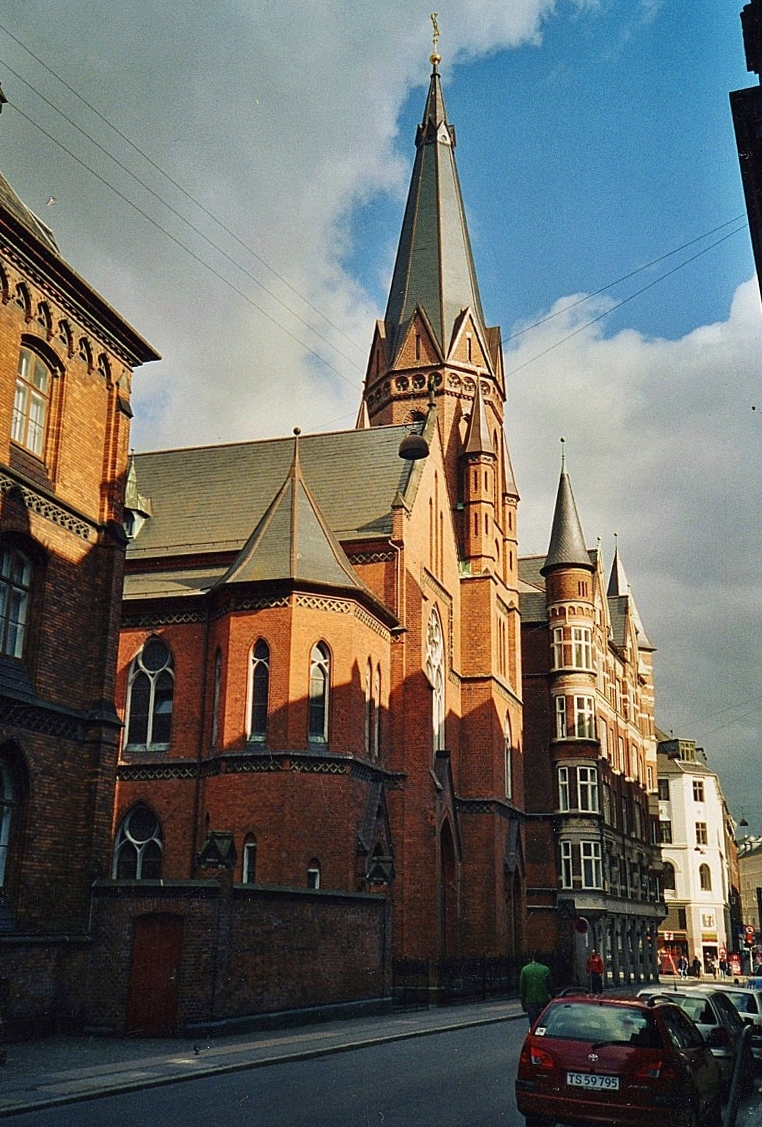
- Church of Jesus' Heart seen from Stenosgade
- Church of Jesus' Heart
- Location: Vesterbro
- Country: Denmark
- Denomination: Roman Catholic
- Website: jesuhjertekirke.dk

History
- Dedication: Sacred Heart

Architecture
- Architect: Friedrich Wipfler
- Architectural type: Neo-Gothic
- Completed: 1895

Administration
- Diocese: Roman Catholic Diocese of Copenhagen

Clergy
- Vicar: Tomislav Cvetko

The Church of Jesus' Heart (Jesu Hjerte Kirke) is a Roman Catholic church in the Vesterbro/Kongens Enghave area of Copenhagen, Denmark. It was built in 1895 and is dedicated to the Sacred Heart of Jesus.

The church has a membership of approximately 1,300. As of 2024, the vicar is Tomislav Cvetko.

== History ==
The church was designed by Friedrich Wipfler, a Jesuit brother, in a neo-Gothic style. Its foundation stone was laid on 8 April 1893. The church was consecrated by bishop Johannes von Euch on 3 November 1895. Initially, the church functioned as the main church of the Jesuit Order in Denmark.

== See also ==
- List of Jesuit sites
- Catholic Church in Denmark
