= Christ the King Church, Nuuk =

Catholic church in Greenland

Christ the King Catholic Church
- "Kristus Kongens" sogn
- Christ the King Catholic Church
- 64°10′45.6″N 51°43′53.6″W
- Location: Nuuk, Greenland
- Country: Denmark
- Denomination: Roman Catholic Church
- Website: http://katolsk.gl

History
- Dedicated: 11 June 1972

Administration
- Diocese: Roman Catholic Diocese of Copenhagen
- Parish: "Kristus Kongens" sogn

Clergy
- Bishop: Czeslaw Kozon

Christ the King Church (Danish: "Kristus Kongens" sogn) is a Catholic parish in the city of Nuuk, Greenland. It is the only Catholic church in Greenland. The parish uses the Latin rite and is under the jurisdiction of the Roman Catholic Diocese of Copenhagen. Although Catholicism arrived in Greenland around the year 1000, when the first churches were built on the island in the thirteenth century most of the settlers had left the scene or had died. After the Protestant Reformation of the sixteenth century, the activities of the Catholic Church were limited, and the Lutheran Church of Denmark became the established church. Today, most of the congregation is made up of foreigners and a small group of locals. In 1980 the Little Sisters of Jesus established a small convent.

Sunday masses are at 17:00 and are followed by a dinner.

== See also ==
- Roman Catholicism in Greenland
- Hvalsey Church
