= Johannes Theodor Suhr =

Danish Roman Catholic bishop (1896–1997)

The Most Reverend Johannes Theodor Suhr O.S.B.
- Bishop of Copenhagen
- Diocese: Copenhagen
- Appointed: 29 April 1953
- In office: 1953–1964
- Predecessor: Josef Ludwig Brems
- Successor: Hans Ludvig Martensen

Orders
- Ordination: 1 April 1933
- Consecration: 15 January 1939 by Pietro Fumasoni Biondi
- Rank: Bishop

Personal details
- Born: January 24, 1896 Nyborg, Denmark
- Died: March 10, 1997 (aged 101) Aabenraa, Denmark
- Buried: Vestre Cemetery

Johannes Theodor Suhr, OSB (24 January 1896 in Nyborg – 10 March 1997) was a Danish Roman Catholic bishop and the second Danish Roman Catholic bishop since the Reformation.

== Early life and conversion to Roman Catholicism ==
Johannes Theodor Suhr was the son of landowner Carl Emil Suhr (1861–1928) and his wife Laura Marie Miller (1859–1919), graduating from Odense Cathedral School in 1913. After that, he was an agricultural student and emigrated after World War I to Argentina where he was a farmer.

Some years later Suhr went back to Denmark, where he became increasingly preoccupied with life's basic questions. During a visit to Rome in 1925, Suhr was intrigued by Catholicism, and on 17 January 1926 he converted to the Roman Catholic Church. Then Suhr traveled to Benedictine Monastery of Clervaux in Luxembourg and entered in the Benedictine Order later in the same year. Suhr studied philosophy and theology in Luxembourg and Rome, was ordained on 1 April 1933 and was appointed prior of the newly established abbey of San Girolamo in Rome in 1935.

== Ecclesiastical career ==
On 14 December 1938, Suhr was appointed by Pope Pius XI to Apostolic Vicariate of Denmark and became titular bishop of Balecio, however Suhr had poor pastoral experience and concerns.

Suhr became bishop and took place in San Girolamo on 15 January 1939 when St. Ansgar's Cathedral in Copenhagen was inaugurated on 3 February 1939. Suhr, on 29 April 1953, became the first "Bishop of Copenhagen" for the newly Roman Catholic Diocese of Copenhagen when Pope Pius XII had created via an apostolic letter on the same date.

He resigned in 1964 reportedly due to failing health. Hans Ludvig Martensen became his successor. In the 1960s, Suhr was a member of the Second Vatican Council's preparatory commission as head in Rome. In 1960 the Nordic bishops organized in the Scandinavian Bishops Conference, and Suhr was the first president.

== Death ==
Bishop Johannes Theodor Suhr died on 10 March 1997, aged 101 in Aabenraa.

== Prizes ==
- Commander of the Order of the Dannebrog (1958)
