= Hans Ludvig Martensen =

Danish theologian and Roman Catholic bishop

His Excellency Hans Ludvig Martensen S.J.
- Bishop of Copenhagen
- Church: Roman Catholic
- Diocese: Roman Catholic Diocese of Copenhagen
- Appointed: 22 March 1965
- In office: 1965-1995
- Predecessor: Johannes Theodor Suhr
- Successor: Czeslaw Kozon

Orders
- Ordination: 15 August 1956
- Consecration: 16 May 1965 by Johannes Theodor Suhr

Personal details
- Born: 7 August 1927 Copenhagen, Denmark
- Died: 13 March 2012 (aged 84)

Hans Ludvig Martensen, S.J. (6 August 1927 – 13 March 2012) was the Catholic bishop of the Diocese of Copenhagen, Denmark.

Martense was born in Copenhagen. In 1956, he was ordained a priest of the Society of Jesus. In 1965 Pope Paul VI appointed him Bishop of Copenhagen; he was consecrated on 16 May by Bishop Johannes Theodor Suhr, O.S.B. He participated in the 4th Session of the Second Vatican Council in September of that year. He resigned as bishop in 1995 and died in 2012.
