= Gustav Friedrich Hetsch =

Danish architect (1788–1864)

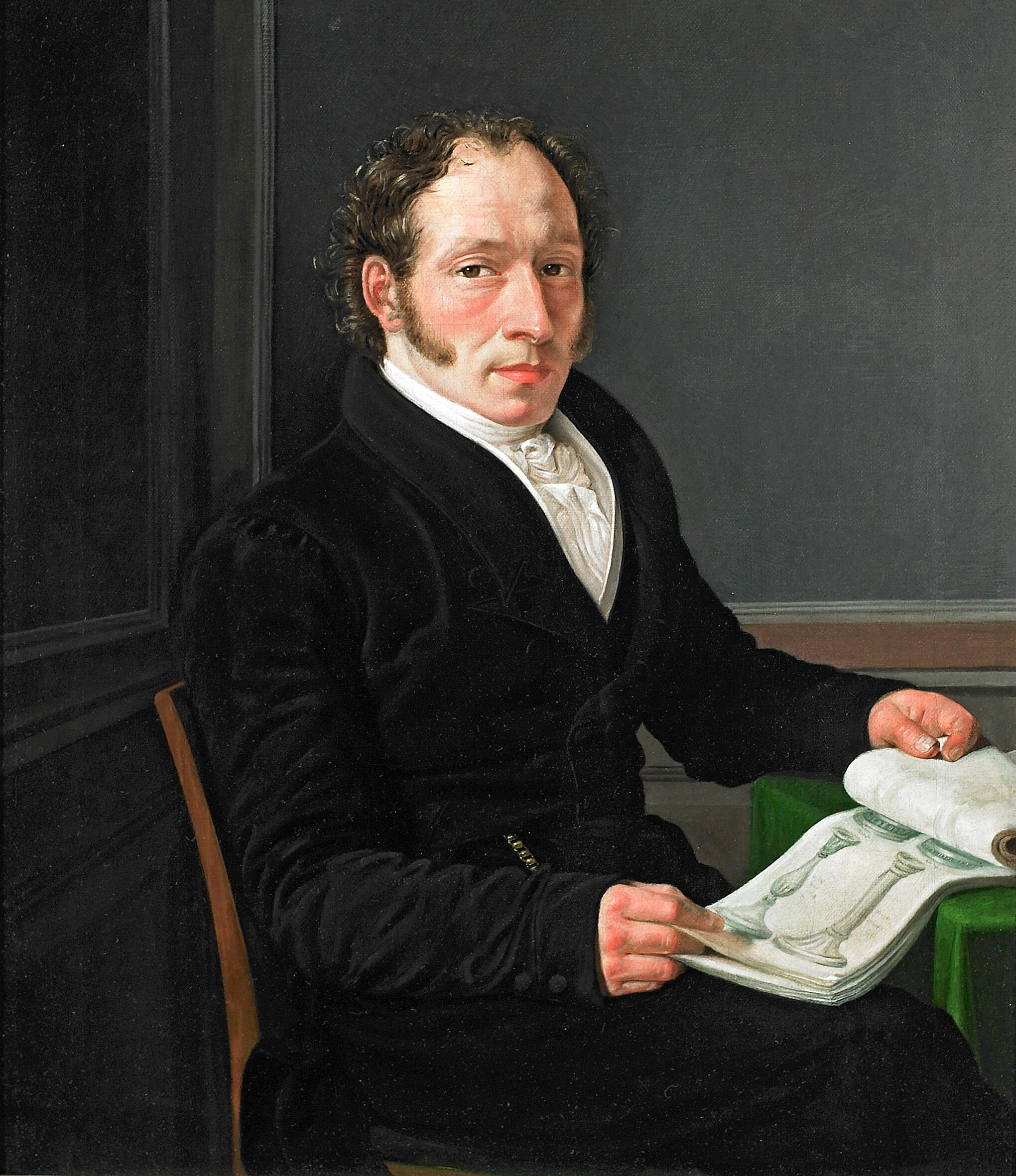
- G.F. Hetsch painted by Eckersberg
- Born: 28 September 1788; Stuttgart, Duchy of Württemberg
- Died: 7 September 1864 (aged 75); Copenhagen, Denmark
- Occupation: Architect
- Buildings: Great Synagogue (Copenhagen); St. Ansgar's Cathedral

Gustav Friedrich (von) Hetsch (28 September 1788 – 7 September 1864) was a Danish architect.

== Early life and education ==
Hetsch was born on 28 September 1788 in Stuttgart to history painter Philipp Friedrich von Hetsch (1758–1838) and Louise Friedericke Wilhelmine Scholl (1766–1800). His father was the director of an art gallery and professor at the academy in Stuttgart. Hetsch studied at the University of Tübingen and in Paris, where his teacher was Charles Percier.

== Career ==
After finishing his studies, he worked for Jean-Baptiste Rondelet on the Church of Sainte-Geneviève. In 1812 he was recalled to Stuttgart, but soon left for Italy, where he continued his studies and met the Danish architect Peder Malling (1781–1865). It was Malling who in 1815 inspired Hetsch to come to Copenhagen, where he taught at the Royal Danish Academy of Fine Arts. In 1820 he became a member of the academy, 1822 professor of perspective, 1829 professor extraordinarily, 1835 professor of architecture.

One of Hetsch's first major projects was the interior decoration of the rebuilt Christiansborg Palace, where Christian Frederik Hansen was the principal architect. Though most of his accomplishments were in the area of decorative art, Hetsch also designed the Great Synagogue (1833) and St. Ansgar's Church (1842) in Copenhagen. In parallel with his duties at the academy he held several other positions, including that of artistic director of the Royal Porcelain Factory (1828–1857).

== Personal life ==
On 23 August 1823 in Frederick's German Church, Hetsch married Anette Hansen (1795-1827). She was the daughter of the architect Christian Frederik Hansen (1756–1845) and Anna M. Rahbek (1773–1811). After her death, on 4 December 1829 in Christiansborg Chapel, he married her sister Caroline Amalie Augusta Hansen (1800-1874).

== Awards ==
Hetsch was created a Knight of the Order of the Dannebrog in 1836. In 1840, he was awarded the Cross of Honour.

== Gallery ==
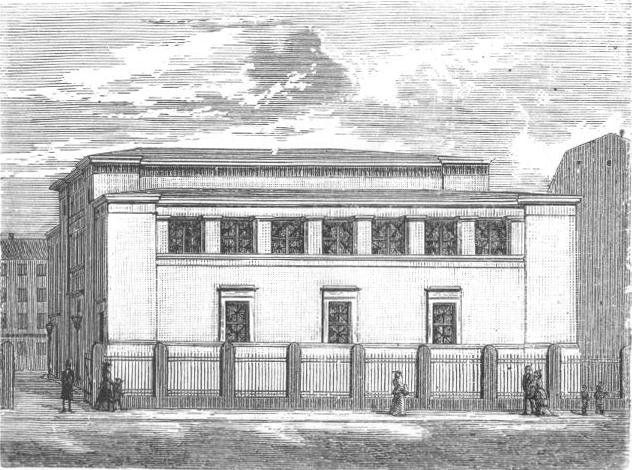
The Great Synagogue in Copenhagen, 1899.

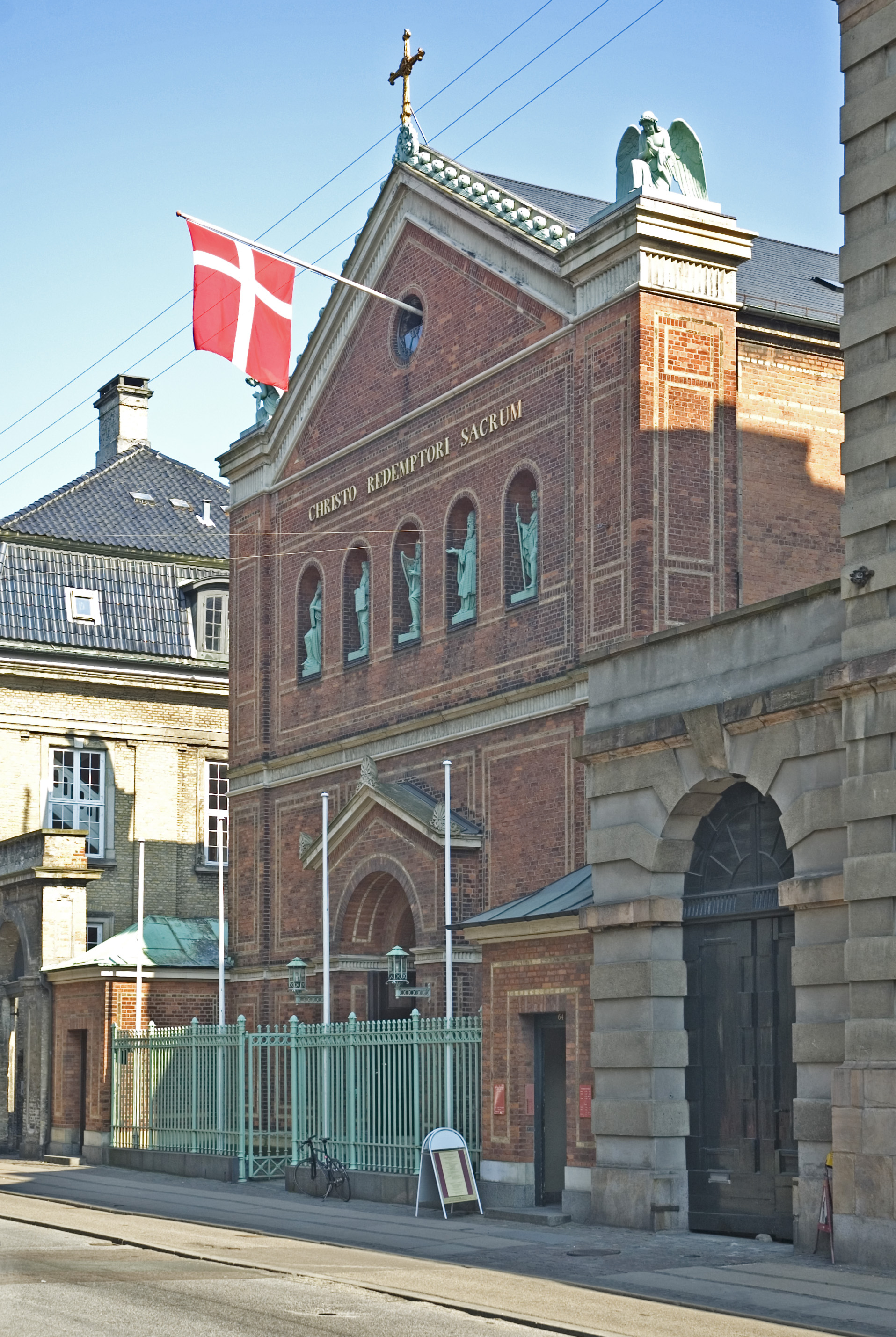
St. Ansgar's Cathedral in Copenhagen, 2007.

== Other sources ==
- Kjeld von Folsach (1988). Fra nyklassicisme til historicisme: arkitekten G.F. Hetsch [From neoclassicism to historicism: the architect G.F. Hetsch]. Copenhagen: Christian Ejlers. ISBN 978-87-7241-966-4.
- "The Soul in Nature — The Danish Golden Age 1800–1850". National Museum of Denmark. Archived from the original on 24 July 2010.
- "Gustav Friederich Hetsch", FamilySearch
- Miller, Judith (19 September 2005). Furniture: World Styles from Classical to Contemporary. Penguin. ISBN 978-0-7566-7288-1.
