= Garðarsson =

Garðarsson is an Icelandic patronymic surname, literally meaning "son of Garðar". Notable people with the name include:

- Bjarki Garðarsson (born 2010), Icelandic footballer
- Finnur Garðarsson (born 1952), Icelandic swimmer
- Gísli Örn Garðarsson (born 1973), Icelandic actor and director
- Sverrir Garðarsson (born 1984), Icelandic footballer
