= St. Mary's Church, Tórshavn =

St. Mary's Church
- Mariukirkjan
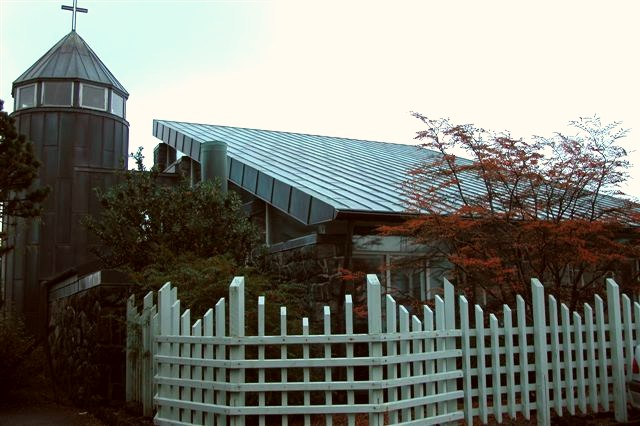
- St. Mary's Church
- 62°0′52.1″N 6°46′47.2″W
- Location: Tórshavn; Faroe Islands
- Country: Faroe Islands
- Denomination: Catholic Church

Administration
- Diocese: Roman Catholic Diocese of Copenhagen

The St. Mary's Church (Faroese: Mariukirkjan) is a parish of the Roman Catholic Church located in Mariugøta 4 in the city of Tórshavn, the capital of the Faroe Islands, in the Diocese of Copenhagen.

While Catholicism was present in the Faroes from 999 AD, after the Danish Reformation, the last Catholic bishop in the islands was executed in 1538. In 1931 two young priests, E. G. Boekenoogen and Thomas King, undertook the task of restoring the Catholic presence in the Faroe Islands. In a rented house to the Franciscan sisters who came to the Faroes in 1931, a small church was consecrated on May 23 the same year. Along with the new school of St. Francis, the sisters had built the new St. Mary's Church was consecrated on June 1, 1933.

== See also ==
- Catholic Church in the Faroe Islands
