= Garðar Cathedral Ruins =

Garðar Cathedral
- The Cathedral of Saint Nicholas
- Garðar Domkirke
- Garðar Cathedral
- 60°59′14″N 45°25′23″W
- Location: Igaliku
- Country: Greenland
- Denomination: Roman Catholic

History
- Status: Ruins
- Founded: 1126; 900 years ago
- Founder: Bishop Arnaldr
- Dedication: Saint Nicholas

Architecture
- Groundbreaking: 12th century

Specifications
- Length: 88 ft (27 m)
- Width: 52 ft (16 m)
- Materials: Red sandstone

Administration
- Diocese: Garðar

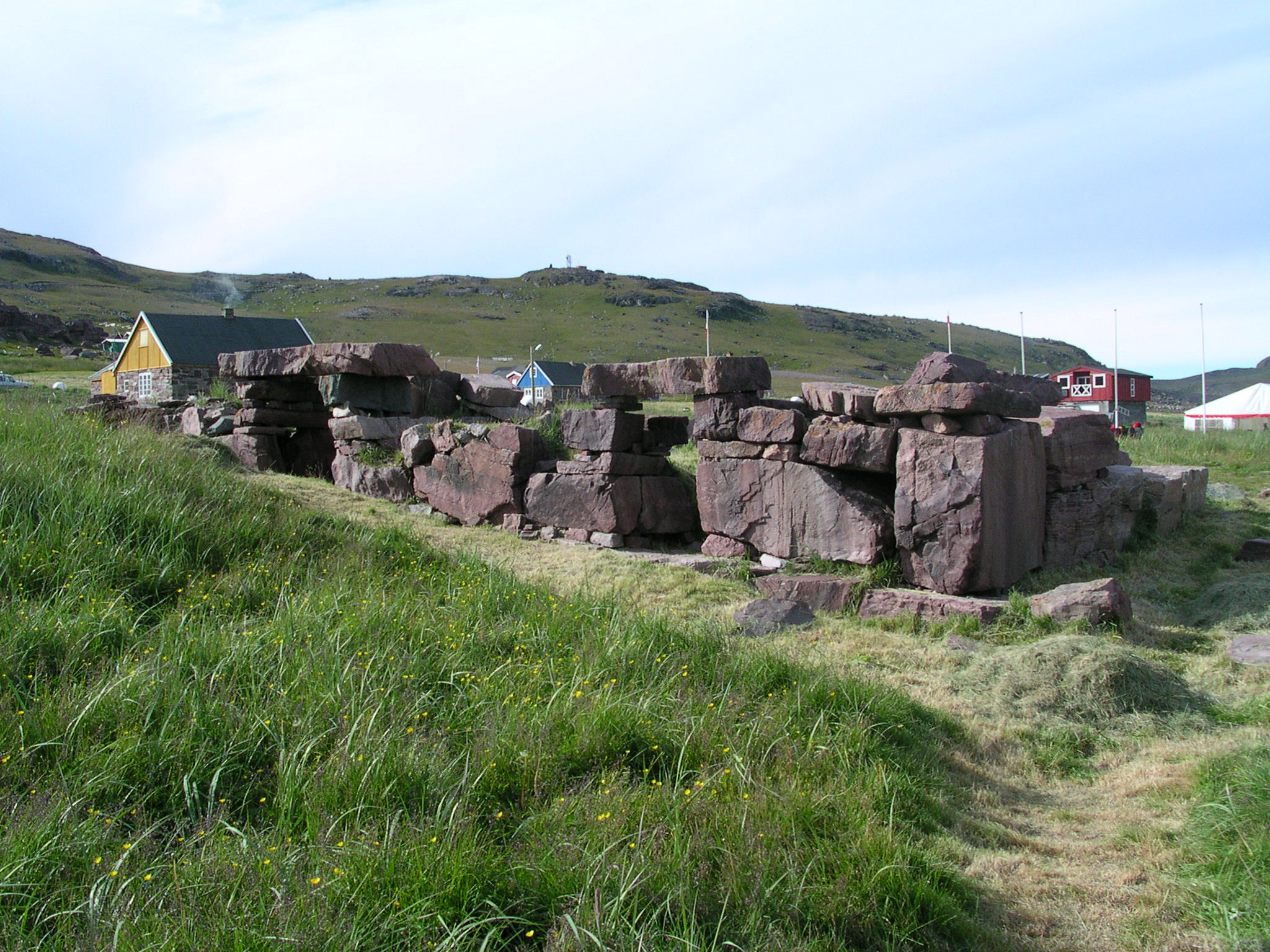
Ruins of the Bishop's Palace

Garðar Cathedral (Danish: Garðar Domkirke), known formally as the Cathedral of Saint Nicholas, was a Roman Catholic cathedral church located in Garðar, situated in Igaliku, Greenland. It was the first cathedral erected in the Americas, and is one of the oldest surviving examples of European architecture in the Americas. The cathedral was reduced to ruins and nowadays only its foundation can be seen.

== History ==
The cathedral was founded by Greenland's first bishop Arnaldur in 1126, built of red sandstone quarried from a neighbouring hillside, in a cruciform, the only known church to be built this way in Greenland. The cathedral was dedicated to the patron saint of sailors, Saint Nicholas. Changes to the cathedral structure may have taken place during Bishop Jón Árnason's, or Jón Smyrill as he is also known, pontificate between 1188 and 1209. A bell tower was also built with the cathedral and windows of opaque, greenish glass. The cathedral chancel was quite narrow. There were also two chapels, one to the north and one to the south of the church, with the smaller chapel being used as a sacristy which included a path that led to the Bishop's residence. A farm and a palace for the bishop were also built, with the farm big enough to hold around 100 cows.

The cathedral wealth expanded during the 13th and 14th centuries, with bishops imposing taxes on the locals. Moreover, no one was able to fish or hunt near the lands of the cathedral without the bishop's consent. Revenues were also collected from local hot springs which were believed to have medicinal value. Nonetheless, by the late 14th century, Greenland began its years of decline. With the death of Bishop Álfur in 1378, no new bishop ever went to Greenland even though they were still appointed until the reformation.

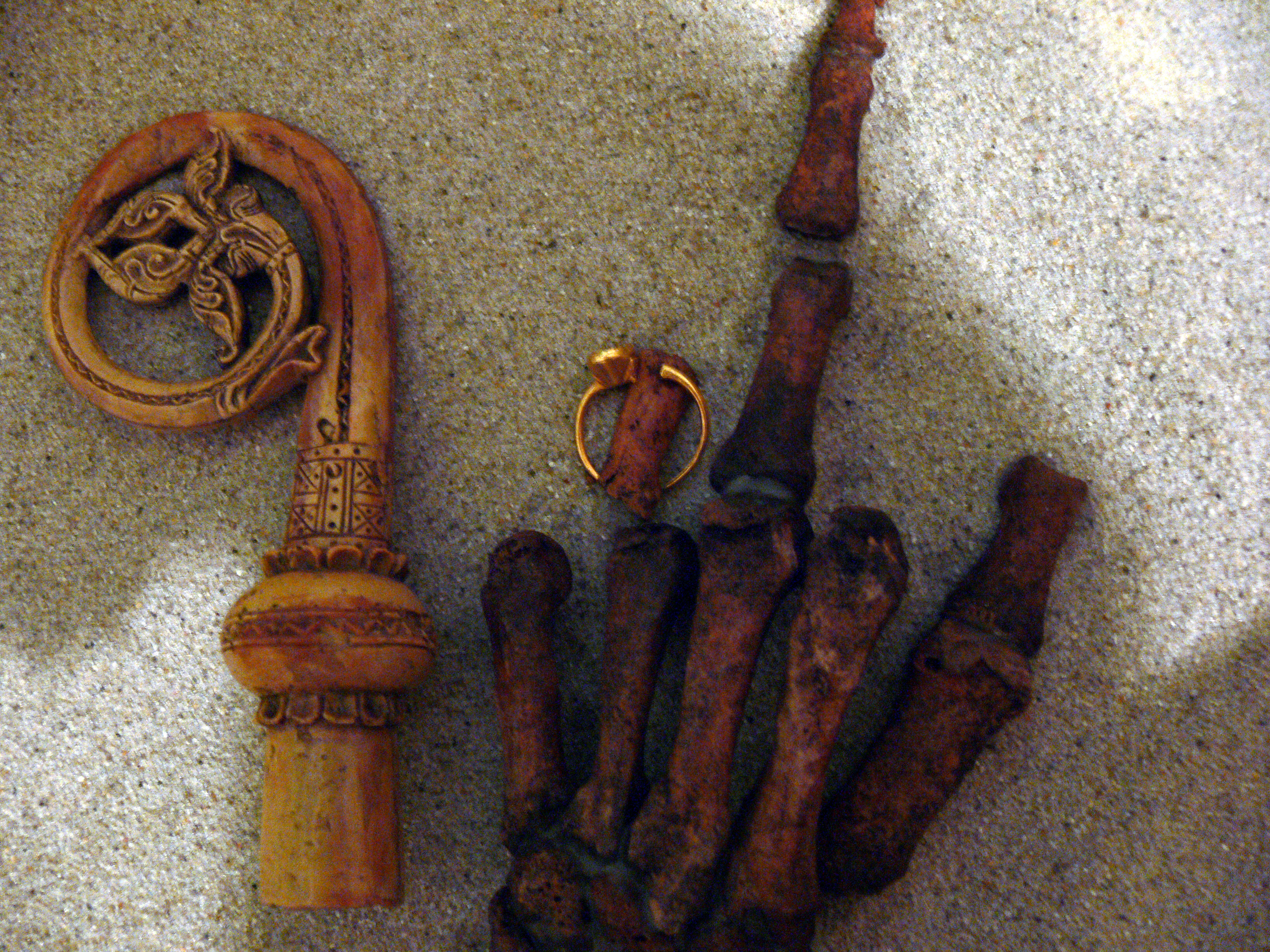
The crosier and ring found with the remains of one of the Bishops of Garðar

== Excavations ==
It was only in 1926 that excavations discovered the foundations of the cathedral and the surrounding Norse buildings. Excavations were carried out by Danish archeologist Poul Nørlund. On the site, a number of walrus skulls and narwhal were discovered, suggesting that the area near the cathedral included a pagan temple. Amongst the most famous excavations include a number of graves, notably a grave of a bishop which was buried in the north chapel of the cathedral. The skeleton discovered was that of a powerfully built, middle-aged man. In his hands, a crosier made of ashwood and decorated with walrus ivory was discovered and a gold ring on the finger. The skeleton from the grave has been radiocarbon dated to 1223-1290 (the calibrated dating is 1272). Olaf was bishop in Greenland in the period 1246–80, so the grave was likely his. A bell was also excavated which may have been in the cathedral tower.
