= St. Knud's Church, Fredericia =

Church in Fredericia Municipality, Denmark

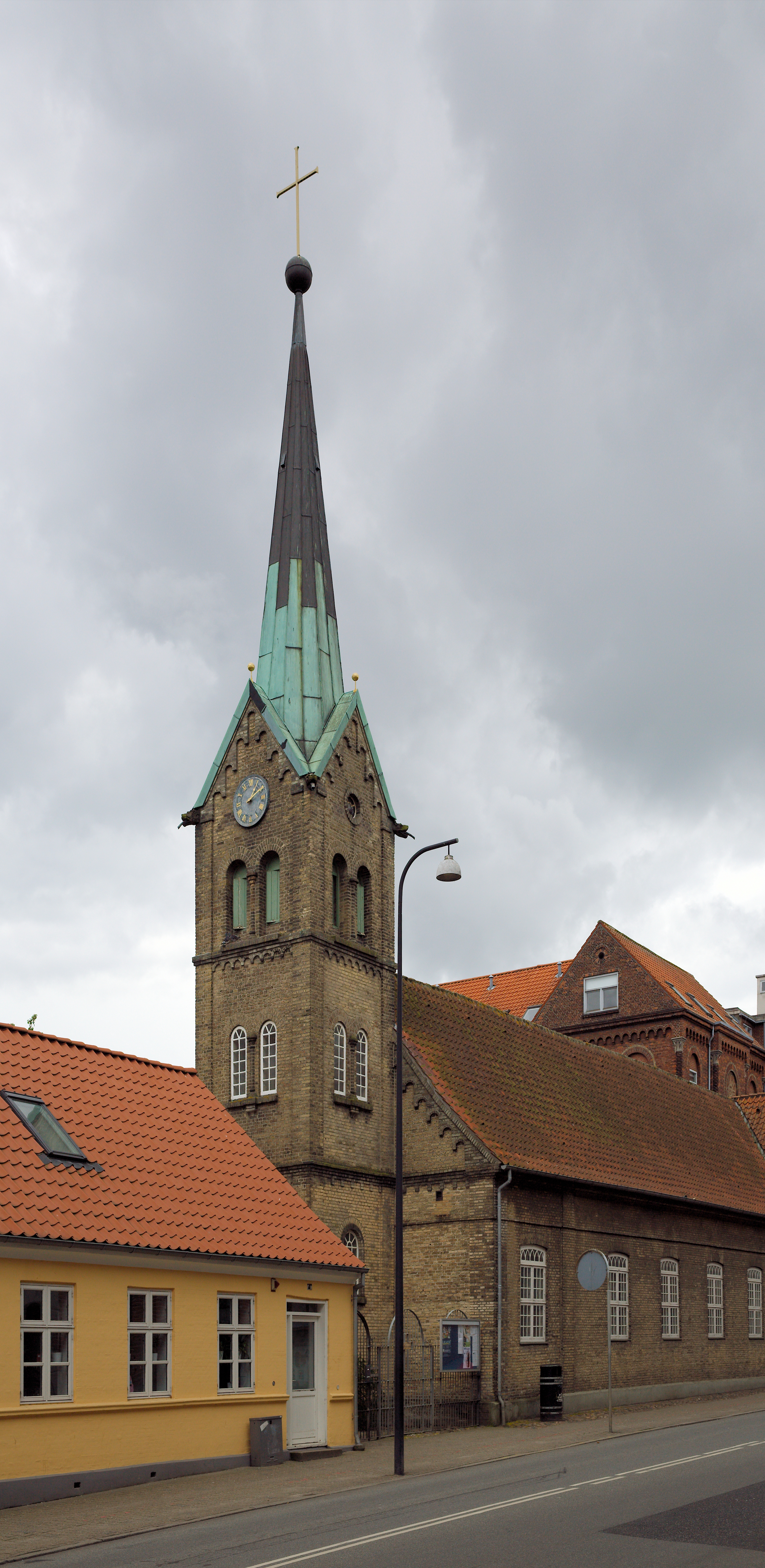
St. Knud's Church in Fredericia

St. Knud's Church is a Roman Catholic church in the Danish city Fredericia. It is a part of the Diocese of Copenhagen. It is built on the same site as the previous St. Knud's Chapel. Its predecessor was the first Catholic church to be founded in Denmark after the reformation.

It is named after Saint Canute, the patron saint of Denmark.

== Early history ==
Fredericia was founded in 1650 by the Danish king Frederik III as a fortress town, to secure military access to the strategically important strait, Little Belt. While the Catholic faith was outlawed in the country as a whole, most of the early inhabitants were German mercenaries, many of whom were Catholic. In order to entice people to move to the new and poorly situated military outpost, king Christian V granted the city freedom of religion, for borth Christians of other denominations than the Church of Denmark and for Sephardic Jews, in 1674 and again in 1682. The Catholic citizens would be allowed to worship, to have a permanent priest and to marry Lutherans, as long as they raised their children in the Lutheran faith.

The first official mass was held in December 1674 in the home of lieutenant colonel van der Weghe, although mass had been held privately by traveling Jesuit Priests earlier than that, by request of the German soldiers. In 1685, the king gave permission for Catholics to be buried on one of the local cemeteries, on the condition that the burial would be without ceremony.

On January 5, 1686, the king gave the local Catholic priests permission to build a chapel with small gravesite, which is where the current St. Knud's Church is situated. The chapel was finished in 1688 and supplied priests from the Diocese of Münster, who were also responsible for the maintenance of the building.

The chapel, as well as the clergy house, library and garden were pawned by the crown in 1744, to pay a fine for allegedly forcing a young girl to convert to Catholicism, as well as sending her to become a nun. The girl was the stepdaughter of a Protestant bell-ringer, and while her conversion was most likely voluntary, the scandal ostracized the Catholic congregation from the surrounding city. During the proceedings, the king Christian VI, threatened to close the church, this was never acted upon, but the Jesuit priests who were still in charge of mass, were exiled from the country for illegal missionary work. The exile and the buildings being pawned, effectively ended the use of the chapel for mass until the verdict was overturned by the new king, Frederik V in 1752.

== Current building ==
The current church building was built in 1767, funded by a donation from the will of Susanna Lucia Bianco. Bianco was the daughter of a wealthy merchant with Italian ancestry, whose the family enjoyed a prominent position in the congregation. The king approved the request for a new church, on the condition that the exterior of the building could not resemble a church and must appear as a residential building. Additionally, there would be no windows to the street and bell-ringing was forbidden. Consequently, the exterior of the church is plain, while the interior is inspired by the rococo sensibilities of the time. The building was probably designed by the court carpenter Franz Joseph Zuber, who also designed a similar chapel for the Austrian embassy around the same time.

Following the suppression of the Jesuit order in 1773, the church was led by a variety of Catholic priests. Johannes Weich died in 1791 as the last in the unbroken line of Jesuit priests, though one more Jesuit priest would follow after the restoration of 1815.

During the Schleswig-Holstein uprising, the church was seized by the military from April 1849 until October the same year. The building was used both as a morgue as well as to contain prisoners of war. This resulted in extensive damage, especially to the organ.

== Modern use ==
The Constitutional Act of 1849 granted freedom of religion to the entire country, which meant that the previous restrictions, on how the church could look and operate, disappeared. It also meant that citizens who didn't live inside the city, were allowed to convert and join the congregation. In the ten years after the passing of the Constitution, the local members became outnumbered, despite the founding of new churches around the country. While the church was still in very bad shape following the war, the priest Johannes von Euch ordered the construction of a tower in 1865. The tower was supposed to mark the thousand year anniversary of the death of Saint Ansgar, as well as the newly established right to have a tower and to ring the bells. The new bell tower was the first of its kind for a Catholic church since the revolution, as well as the first church tower in Fredericia to have a spire. It contained two bells, named Ansgar and Maria, after the virgin Mary.

After the construction of the tower, von Euch continued to restore and expand upon the church. The renovations continued after his death and throughout the 20th century, with the addition of electricity and central heating being especially notable.

The church is still in use today, sharing a priest with St. Norberts Church in Vejle. The current priest is Gregor Pahl O.Praem.
