= Erik Gnupsson =

Icelandic clergyman and the first bishop of Greenland (11th–12th centuries)

Erik Gnupsson or Eiríkr Gnúpsson, also known as Henricus (late 11th to early 12th centuries), may have been a bishop of Greenland.

Very little is known about him. Some considered him as the first bishop of America, residing at Garðar. However, the historical record does not attest to where he held his bishop's seat, and only states that he went in search of Vinland. It cannot be determined from the Icelandic Annals that he went in search of an existing Norse colony in Vinland. The first official bishop in Greenland is Arnald, in 1124.
