= Reformed Synod of Denmark =

The Reformed Synod of Denmark (Danish: Den reformerte Synode) is a synod (council) of four Calvinist free church congregations in Denmark. A member of the World Communion of Reformed Churches, it has approximately 700 members.

The current moderator is Sabine Hofmeister. The Synod's office is at Fredericia, in Southern Denmark.

== Congregations ==
- Reformed Congregation in Fredericia (Den reformerte Meighed i Fredericia, sometimes referred to as the French Reformed Church in Fredericia), founded by Huguenots in 1719, 300 members.
- French Reformed Church in Copenhagen (French: Eglise réformée française de Copenhague), founded 1685, 50 members, has close ties with the French Reformed Church in Stockholm, Sweden (see Swedish Free Church Council).
- German Reformed Church in Copenhagen (German: Deutsch-Reformierte Kirche zu Kopenhagen), founded in 1685, 300 members (primarily Germans, Dutch, Hungarians, Swiss and Americans, but also some Danes).
- Korean Reformed Church in Copenhagen, founded in 1989, joined the Synod in 1997, 50 members, led by a Korean pastor.

== See also ==
- Charlotte Amalie of Hesse-Kassel (or Hesse-Cassel)
- Religion in Denmark
