= Czeslaw Kozon =

Danish prelate of the Catholic Church

His Excellency Czeslaw Kozon
- Bishop of Copenhagen
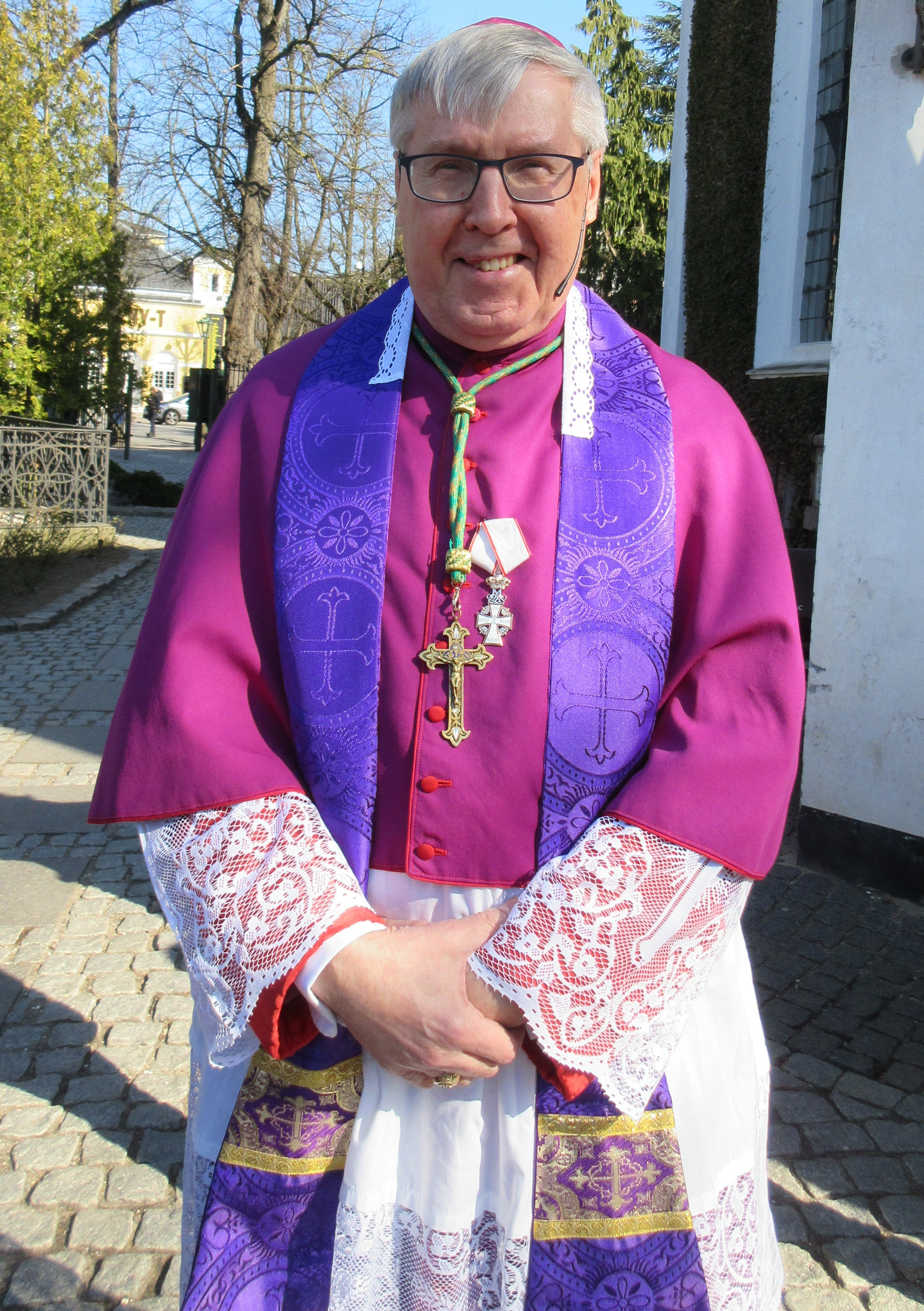
- Kozon in 2025
- Native name: Czesław Kozon
- Church: Catholic Church
- Diocese: Roman Catholic Diocese of Copenhagen
- Appointed: 22 March 1995
- Installed: 7 May 1995
- Predecessor: Hans Ludvig Martensen

Orders
- Ordination: 6 January 1979
- Consecration: 7 May 1995 by Hans Ludvig Martensen

Personal details
- Born: 17 November 1951 (age 74) Idestrup, Falster, Denmark
- Motto: Veritatem in Caritate
- Coat of arms

Czeslaw Kozon (Danish pronunciation: [ˈɕeslɑw kɔˈsoːn]; Latin: Ceslaus; born 17 November 1951) is a Danish Catholic prelate who has served as Bishop of Copenhagen since 1995.

== Biography ==
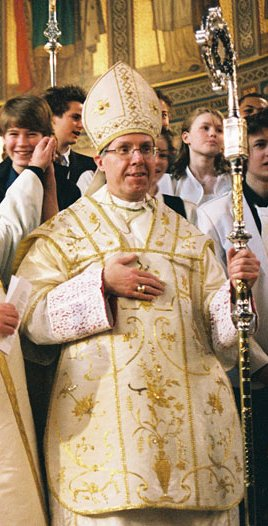
Kozon in liturgical clothing

Czeslaw Kozon was born in Idestrup, Falster, Denmark, on 17 November 1951 to parents who were emigres from Communist Poland. He studied philosophy and theology at the Pontifical Gregorian University and the Pontifical Lateran University. He was ordained a priest for the Diocese of Copenhagen on 6 January 1979 by Bishop Hans Ludvig Martensen. He served briefly as assistant priest at St. Ansgar's in Copenhagen and then in other parishes until he was appointed vicar general of the diocese in 1994.

On 22 March 1995, Pope John Paul II appointed him Bishop of Copenhagen. He was consecrated by Bishop Martensen on 7 May 1995.

On 22 March 2023, he was elected one of the vice presidents of the Commission of the Bishops' Conferences of the European Union (COMECE).

Kozon is the Grand Prior of the Sweden-Denmark Lieutenancy of the Equestrian Order of the Holy Sepulchre of Jerusalem.

Styles of Czeslaw Kozon
- Reference style: The Most Reverend
- Spoken style: Your Excellency
- Religious style: Monsignor
- Posthumous style: not applicable
