= Garðar, Greenland =

Catholic Titular See

Garðar
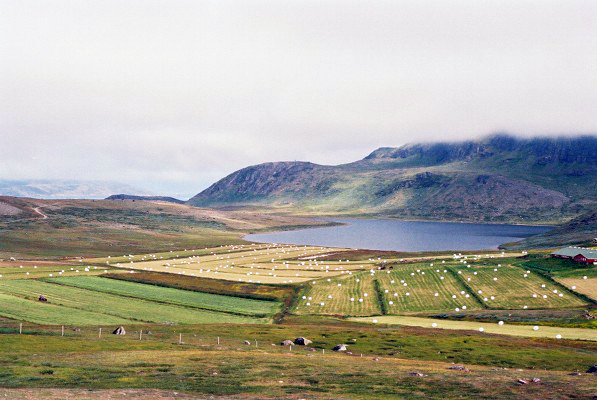
- Harvesting the hay in Vatnahverfi, Garðar

- Location of the site in Greenland
- 60°59′13.56″N 45°25′22.44″W
- Location: Kujalleq, Greenland

UNESCO World Heritage Site
- Part of: Kujataa Greenland: Norse and Inuit Farming at the Edge of the Ice Cap
- Criteria: Cultural: v
- Reference: 1536-002
- Inscription: 2017 (41st Session)

Garðar was the seat of the bishop in the Norse settlements in Greenland. It was the first Catholic diocese established in the Americas and is now a Latin Catholic titular see.

== Diocese ==
The sagas tell that Sokki Þórisson, a wealthy farmer of the Brattahlíð area, launched the idea of a separate bishop for Greenland in the early 12th century and got the approval of the Norwegian King Sigurd I Magnusson 'the Crusader' (1103–1130). Most of the clergy came from Norway.

== Bishops ==
- The first bishop of Garðar, Arnaldur, was ordained by the Archbishop of Lund in 1124. He arrived in Greenland in 1126. He began the construction of Garðar Cathedral which was dedicated to the patron saint of sailors, St Nicholas.
- The diocese was first assigned to the ecclesiastical province of the German Metropolitan Archbishopric of Bremen. The diocese was subject to the Archdiocese of Lund (present-day Sweden) from 1126 to 1152. Arnaldur returned to Norway in 1150 and became bishop of Hamar (Norway) in 1152.
- In 1152, this diocese, as well as those of Iceland, the Isle of Man, the Orkney Islands and the Faroe Islands, became suffragans to the newly established Norwegian Metropolitan Archdiocese of Nidaros (now Trondheim). The second bishop was Jón Knútr, who served from 1153 to 1186.
- The third bishop was Jón Árnason (nicknamed Smyril). He took office in 1189. In 1202–1203 he went on a pilgrimage to Rome and met Pope Innocent III. He died in Garðar in 1209 and was buried there, most likely in the Northern Chapel of the cathedral.
- The next bishop, Helgi, arrived in Greenland in 1212 and was bishop until his death in 1230.
- In 1234, Nikulás was ordained. He arrived in Greenland in 1239. He died in 1242.
- Ólafr was ordained in the same year, arriving in 1247. He remained bishop until the mid-1280s. He was abroad from 1264 to 1280, thus hardly serving in his own diocese.
- The next bishop was Þórdr, who stayed in Garðar from 1289 until his return to Norway in 1309.
- The next bishop was Árni, from 1315 to 1347. Due to poor communication between Greenland and Norway, it was assumed that he had died and a new bishop (Jón Skalli) was ordained in 1343. When it was discovered that bishop Árni was still alive, Skalli resigned and never went to Greenland. Jon Skalli never visited Garðar.
- After Árni's death in 1347 there was a 19-year vacancy period. Norwegian cleric Ivar Bardsson served as principal during the interim period.
- Bishop Álfr was ordained in 1365 and served as the last effectively residential bishop of Garðar until 1378. When Björn Einarsson Jórsalafari landed in Greenland in 1385, he found the diocese being administered by a priest.
- The Greenland diocese disappeared in the 15th century, when ships from Norway stopped arriving.
- News of the diocese has been reported in two letters by popes Nicholas V and Alexander VI, first compiled by papal chamberlain J. C. Heywood in 1893 in Rome and republished in 1903.

=== List of residential bishops ===
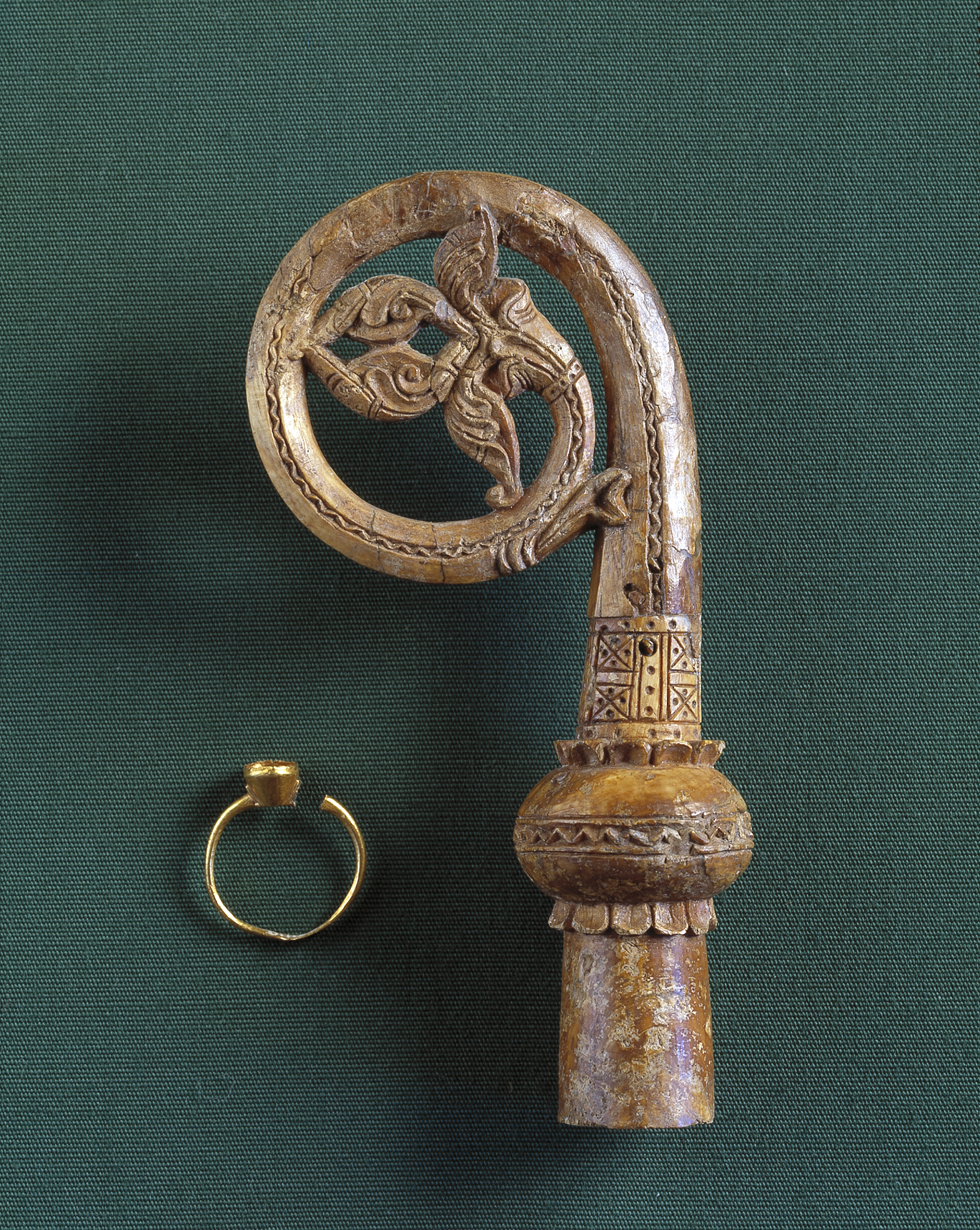
Crosier and episcopal ring of a 13th-century Greenlandic bishop. The skeleton from the grave has been radiocarbon dated to 1223-1290 (the calibrated dating is 1272). Olaf was bishop in Greenland in the period 1246-80, so the grave was likely his.

Residential bishops
Bishop	Consecrated	Served years
Eiríkr Gnúpsson	Before 1112	1112–1121 (Served in Greenland prior to the establishment of the see)
Arnaldr	1124	1126–1150
Jón knútr	1150	(After 1150)–1187
Jón smyrill Árnason	1188	1189–1209
Helgi	1210-1212	1212–1230
Nikolás	1234	1239–1242
Óláfr	1246	1247–1280
Þórðr	1288	1289–1309
Árni	1313 (or 1314)	1315–1347 (or 1348)
Álfr	1365	1368–1377 (or 1378)

=== Ghost see ===
Although the diocese had ceased to function, 'full' bishops were nominated to the see until 1537 and the Reformation in Denmark–Norway and Holstein, apparently none of whom ever visited the diocese:

- Henricus (mentioned in 1386)
- Bertholdus (circa 1407)
- Jacobus Treppe, Friars Minor (O.F.M.) (27 March 1411 – death 1421)
- Nicolaus
- Robertus Ryngman, O.F.M. (30 May 1425 – ?)
- Gobelinus Volant, Canons Regular of Saint Augustine (C.R.S.A.) (circa 1 October 1431 – 19 March 1432), next bishop of Diocese of Børglum (Denmark) (1432.03.19 – ? not possessed)
- Johannes Erles de Moys, O.F.M. (12 July 1432 – ?)
- Bartholomeus de Sancto Hyppolito, O.P. (1433 – death 1440)
- Gregorius (1440 – 1450)
- Andreas
- Jacobus Blaa, Dominican Order (O.P.) (16 June 1481 – ? deposed)
- Mathias Canuto (Matthias Knutsson), a Danish monk of the Benedictine Order (O.S.B.) (9 July 1492 – ?). He had desired to reach Gardar in person, but there is no indication he ever did.
- Vincenz Kampe, O.F.M. (20 June 1519 – 1537).

== Titular see ==
In 1996, the diocese was nominally restored as Latin titular bishopric of Gardar (Curiate Italian) / Garðar (Norsk bokmål Norwegian) / Garden(sis) (Latin adjective).

Its single incumbent is Edward William Clark, Auxiliary bishop of Los Angeles (16 January 2001 – 2022). In modern Greenland Catholics are part of the Diocese of Copenhagen. There are only about 100 Catholics in the entire territory, and most are immigrants from the Philippines, Vietnam, or Denmark.

== Remains ==
The settlement of Igaliku is situated on the same geographic location. The site has been the subject of archaeological investigations since the 1830s. The cathedral was the primary target of much of the archaeological work and was fully excavated in 1926 by Danish archaeologist Poul Nørlund (1888–1951). Nørlund made several scientific studies in Greenland starting in 1921 and ending in 1932.

Many Norse settlement ruins remain visible in Igaliku. The ruins mostly consist of the stone foundations of the walls in their original positions so that the extent of the settlement, both individual buildings and collectively, can be determined and understood. The main ruin is of Garðar Cathedral, a cross-shaped church built of sandstone in the 12th century. The maximum length is 27 metres (89 ft), the width 16 metres (52 ft). Two large barns are on the site, able to have held up to 160 cows.

== See also ==
- List of Catholic dioceses in Denmark
- Norse settlements in Greenland
- Western Settlement
- Middle Settlement
- Eastern Settlement
- Bishop of Greenland (Lutheran Bishop)
- Erik Gnupsson

== Sources and external links ==
- Grønland i middelalderen fra landnam til undergang
- GCatholic
- Grønlands Forhistorie (Gyldendal København, 2005) ISBN 87-02-01724-5
- Diamond, Jared M. Collapse: How Societies Choose to Fail or Succeed, pg.232; Viking Press, 2005 ISBN 0-670-03337-5
- Albrethsen, Svend E. (2004). Norse ruins of the Southern Paamiut and Ivittuut region. SILA-The Greenland Research Centre at the Danish National Museum and Danish Polar Center. ISBN 8790369726. OCLC 70276237.
