= St. Ansgar's Cathedral =

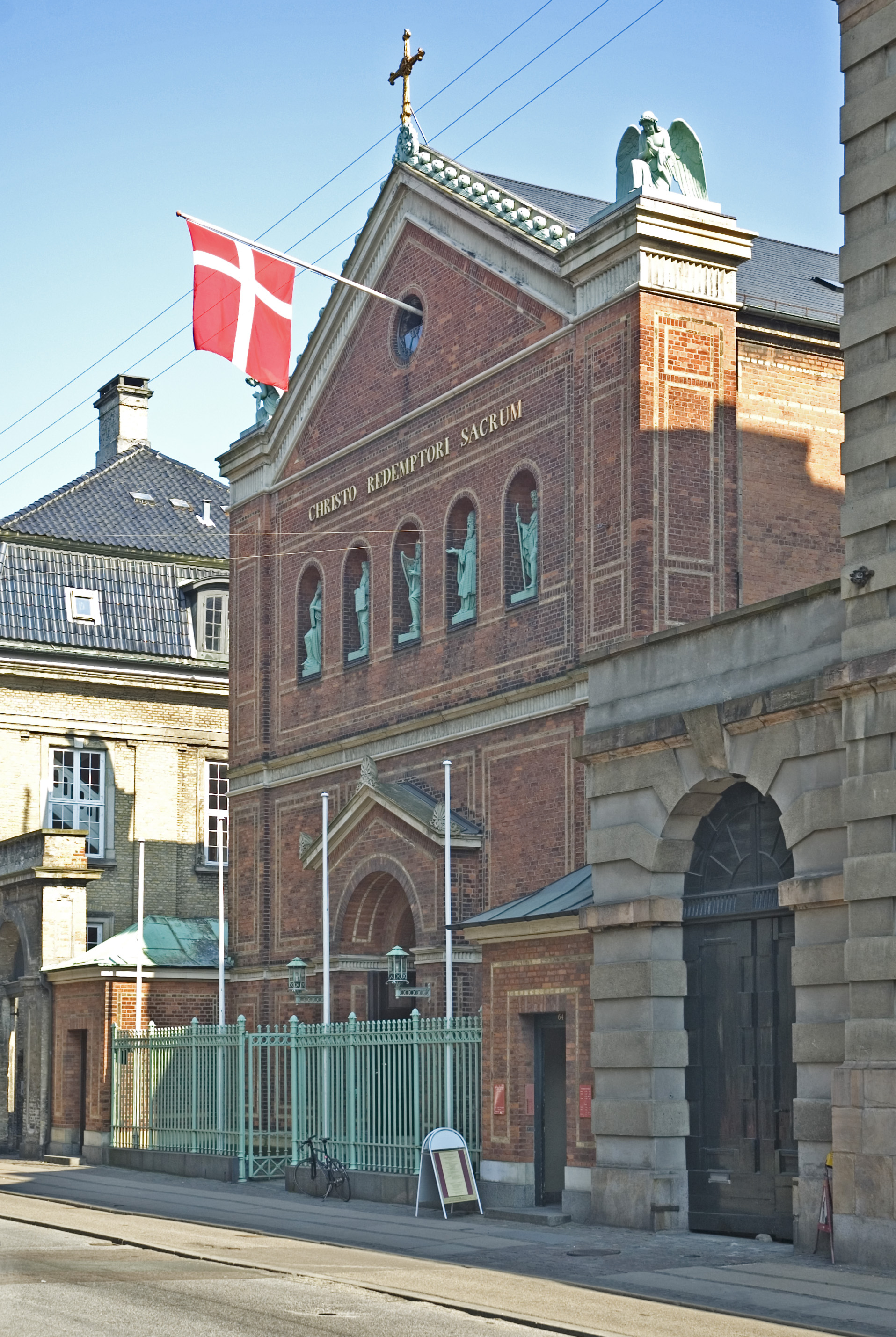
- St. Ansgar's Cathedral
- 55°41′10″N 12°35′33″E
- Location: Copenhagen
- Country: Denmark
- Denomination: Roman Catholic
- Website: sanktansgar.dk

History
- Status: Cathedral
- Founded: 1840
- Dedication: Saint Ansgar
- Consecrated: 1 November 1842

Architecture
- Functional status: Active
- Architect: Gustav Friedrich Hetsch
- Architectural type: Basilica
- Style: Neoclassicism

Administration
- Diocese: Copenhagen

Clergy
- Bishop: Czeslaw Kozon

Saint Ansgar's Cathedral (Danish: Sankt Ansgars Kirke — Katolsk Domkirke) in Copenhagen, Denmark, is the principal church of the Roman Catholic Diocese of Copenhagen, which encompasses all of Denmark, including the Faroe Islands and Greenland. It was consecrated in 1842 and became a cathedral in 1941.

== History ==
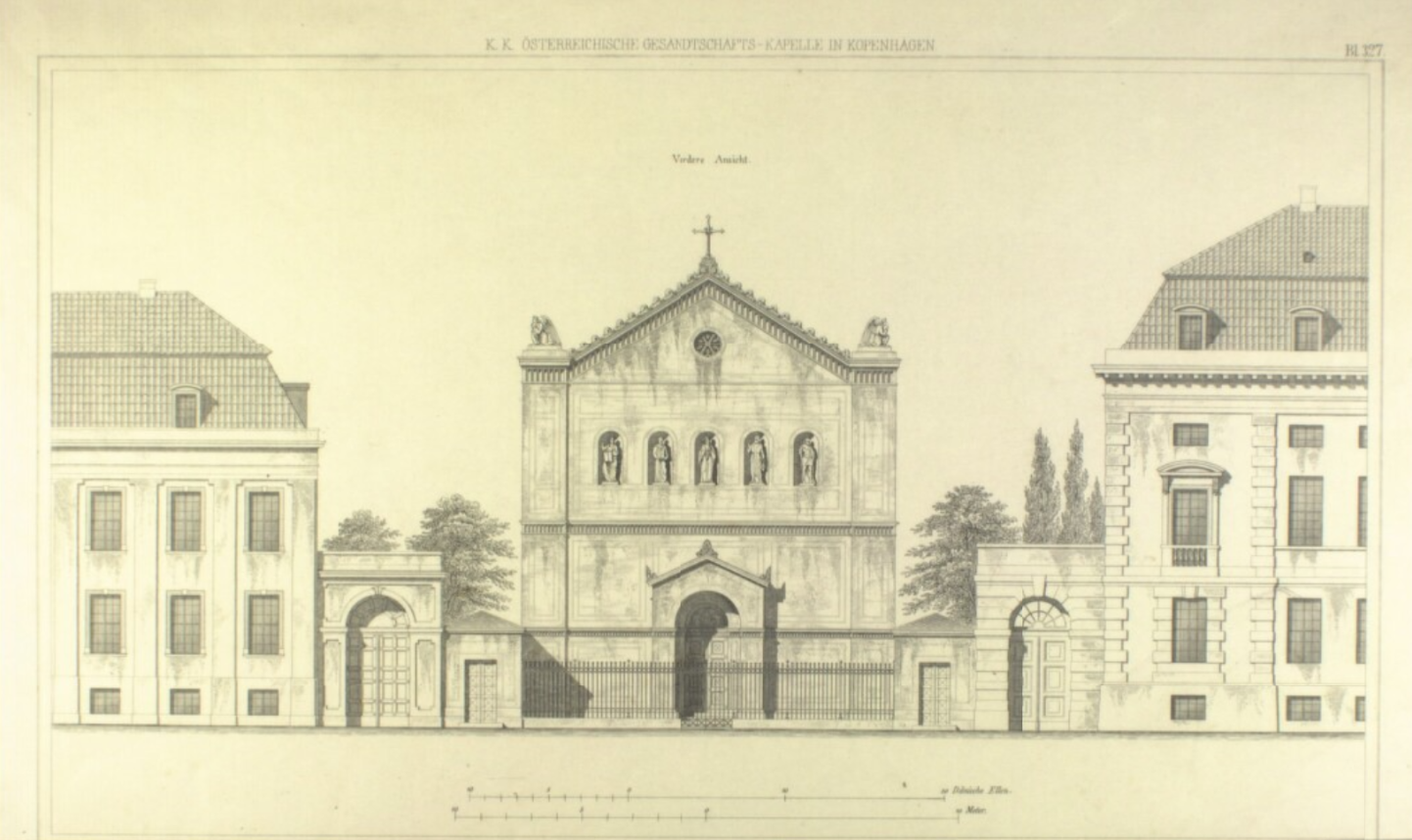
Drawing from 1850

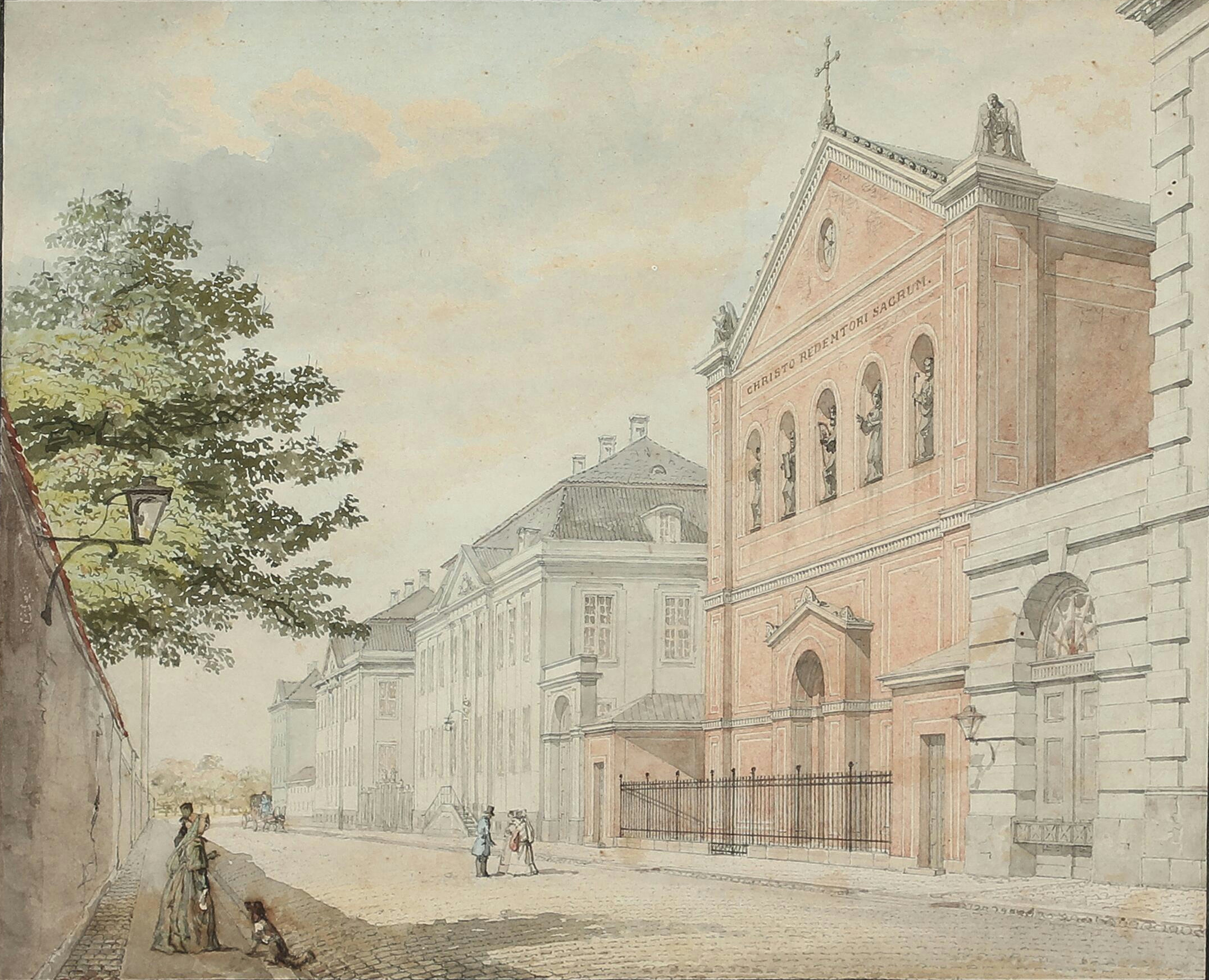
St. Ansgar's Cathedral by H. G. F. Holm

The first Catholic congregations in Denmark after the Protestant reformation were centered on foreign legations. Starting with the one formed by the Spanish diplomat (and poet) Count Bernardino de Rebolledo, who served in Denmark between 1648 and 1659, continuous church registers were kept. From its original location at de Rebolledo's residence on Østergade the chapel moved around between various legation addresses, but in 1764 it settled at the present location on what is now Bredgade. For some time the Austrian legation had been the main supporter of the congregation, and the new chapel was financed by Empress Maria Theresia.

The present-day church was designed by the German-born architect Gustav Friedrich Hetsch. Construction began in 1840 and the church was consecrated on All Saints' Day, 1 November 1842. During 1988–1992 the church underwent extensive restoration in collaboration with the National Museum of Denmark under the direction of the architect Vilhelm Wohlert.

The cathedral possesses a skull relic long believed to be of the early pope St. Lucius. However, the Aarhus University radiocarbon-dated the skull to 340–431 AD, eliminating the possibility of belonging to Lucius, who died in 254. Previously, the relic had been in Roskilde Cathedral which was originally dedicated to the saint.
