= Roman Catholic Diocese of Copenhagen =

Diocese of the Catholic Church

Diocese of Copenhagen Dioecesis Hafniensis Bispedømmet København

Catholic
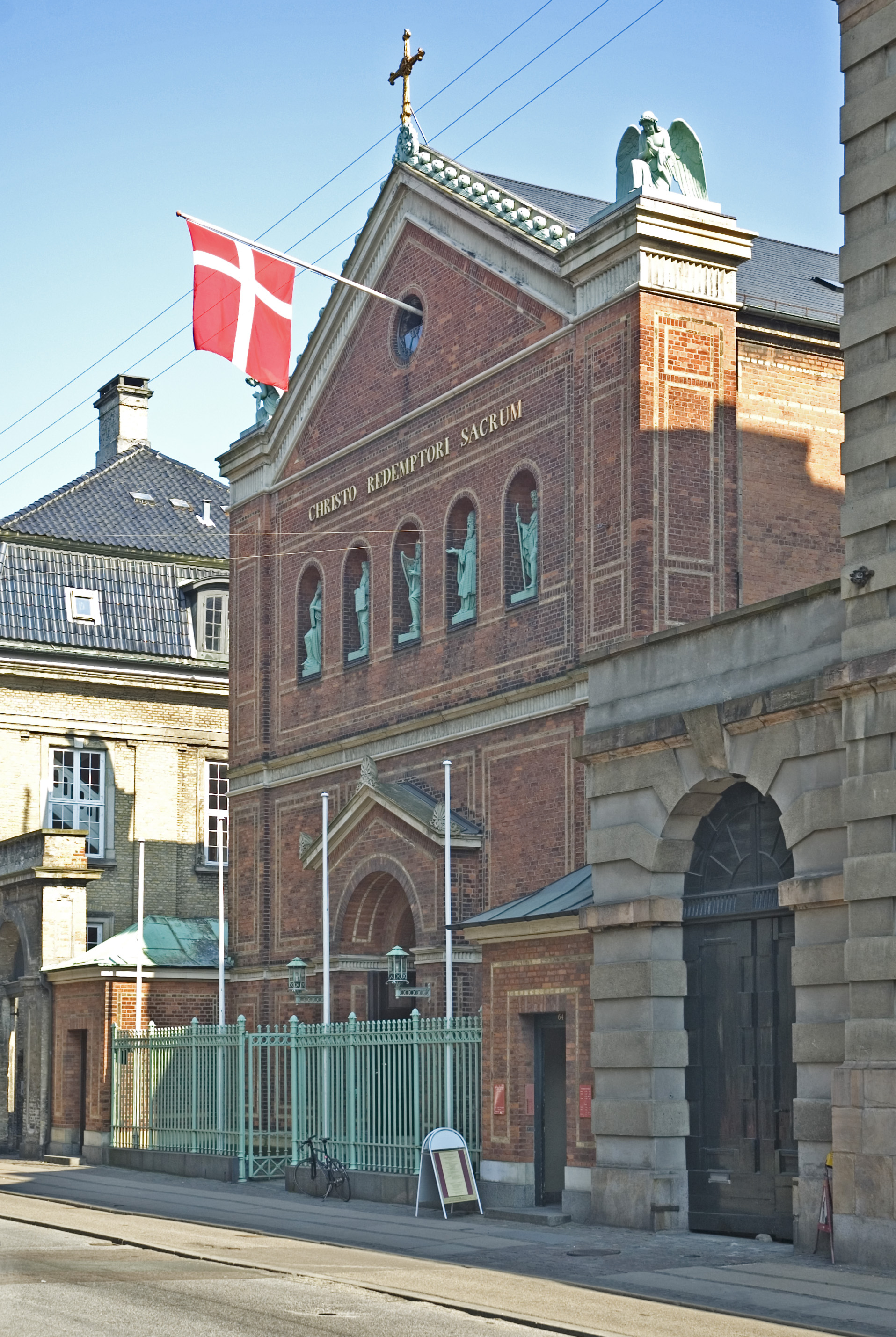
- St. Ansgar's Cathedral

- Coat of arms

Location
- Country: Denmark
- Territory: All of Denmark, including the Faroe Islands and Greenland
- Metropolitan: Immediately subject to the Holy See
- Coordinates: 55°41′9.88″N 12°35′31.86″E

Statistics
- Area: 2,220,093 km^{2} (857,183 sq mi)
- Population: Total; Catholics: (as of 2013); ▲5,707,749; ▲38,614 ( 0.7%)
- Parishes: 47

Information
- Denomination: Catholic Church
- Sui iuris church: Latin Church
- Rite: Roman Rite
- Established: April 29, 1953
- Cathedral: St. Ansgar's Cathedral
- Secular priests: 78

Current leadership
- Pope: Leo XIV
- Bishop: Czeslaw Kozon

Website
- katolsk.dk

The Diocese of Copenhagen is a Latin Church ecclesiastical territory or diocese of the Catholic Church named after its episcopal see, the Danish national capital, Copenhagen and covers all Denmark. The diocese also covers two Danish overseas possessions, the Faroe Islands and Greenland. It is estimated that 36,000 (0.7%) out of the 5,516,597 inhabitants of the diocesan territory are Catholics.

The Diocese of Copenhagen is exempt immediately to the Holy See. The principal church of the diocese is St. Ansgar's Cathedral. The current bishop, appointed in 1995, is Czeslaw Kozon.

== History ==
Following the Protestant Reformation in Denmark, a Catholic mission was first reestablished in Denmark on August 7, 1688 as the Vicariate Apostolic of the Northern Missions. As in neighbouring provinces, none of the pre-Reformation bishoprics were re-established after the Reformation, and the mission in Copenhagen became its only province in the Kingdom of Denmark. In 1869, the Vicariate Apostolic was demoted as the Apostolic Prefecture of Denmark. On March 15, 1892, it was again promoted as the Vicariate Apostolic of Denmark. Only on April 29, 1953 was it promoted as the regular, post-missionary Diocese of Copenhagen.

== Bishops of the Diocese ==
- The Rev. Hermann Grüder (Prefect of Denmark: 1869–1883)
- The Most Rev. Johannes Von Euch (Prefect of Denmark: 1883–1894; Vicar Apostolic of Denmark: 1894–1922)
- The Most Rev. Josef Ludwig Brems, O.Praem (Vicar Apostolic of Denmark: 1922–1938)
- The Most Rev. Johannes Theodor Suhr, O.S.B. (Vicar Apostolic of Denmark: 1939–1953; Bishop of Copenhagen: 1953–1964)
- The Most Rev. Hans Ludvig Martensen, S.J. (Bishop of Copenhagen: 1965–1995)
- The Most Rev. Czeslaw Kozon (Bishop of Copenhagen: 1995–current)

== See also ==
- Catholic Church in Denmark
- Christ the King Church, Nuuk, Greenland
- List of Catholic dioceses in Nordic Europe
