= Apostolic Vicariate of Northern Germany =

Catholic missionary jurisdiction (1868–1930)

Apostolic Vicariate of Northern Germany (1868–1930) the Nordic Missions (1667–1868) Vicariatus Apostolicus … Germaniae Septentrionalis Missionum Septentrionalium Apostolisches Vikariat der Nordischen Missionen Deutschlands (1868–1930) Apostolisches Vikariat der Nordischen Missionen (de)/ Det apostoliske vikariat i nord (no)

Location
- Country: areas in today’s Germany (1868–1930) areas in today’s Denmark, Faroe Islands, Finland, Northern Germany, Greenland, Iceland, Norway, and Sweden (1669–1868)
- Ecclesiastical province: exempt

Statistics
- Area: 18,947 km^{2} (7,315 sq mi)
- Population: Total; Catholics: (as of 1900/1905); 1,944,861; 57,320 (2.95%)

Information
- Denomination: Catholic
- Sui iuris church: Latin Church
- Rite: Roman Rite
- Established: 28 April 1667 renamed: 7 August 1868 dissolved: 13 August 1930

Current leadership
- Apostolic Vicar: last: Hermann Wilhelm Berning

The Vicariate Apostolic of Northern Germany (Latin: Vicariatus Apostolicus Germaniae Septentrionalis), known for most of its existence as the Vicariate Apostolic of the Northern (or Nordic) Missions (Latin: Vicariatus Apostolicus Missionum Septentrionalium), was a Catholic missionary jurisdiction established on 28 April 1667. It belonged to a vicar apostolic in predominantly Protestant Northern Europe.

On 7 August 1868, the occasion of completing separate jurisdictions for all of Scandinavia, the vicariate only continued to comprise small areas in Northern Germany and was thus renamed. With the integration of these areas into other Catholic dioceses, the vicariate ceased to exist on 13 August 1930.

== History ==
The Reformation in the 16th century caused the Roman Catholic Church to lose almost all of Northern Europe. In 1582 the stray Catholics of Denmark, Finland, Northern Germany, Norway, and Sweden were placed under the jurisdiction of an Apostolic Nuncio to Cologne. The Congregation de propaganda fide, on its establishment in 1622, took charge of the vast missionary field, which at its third session it divided among the nuncio of Brussels (for the Catholics in Denmark and Norway), the nuncio at Cologne (much of Northern Germany) and the nuncio of Poland (Finland, Mecklenburg, and Sweden).

Following the organisational structure of the Church the apostolic vicariate included the diocesan areas of bishoprics, where Roman Catholic jurisdiction had effectively been abolished (see the list in section Dioceses comprised in the vicariate). This was partially due to (1) secular rulers or governments repressing Catholic faith and clergy in their territories, which comprised the diocesan areas, (2) due to the fact that incumbent bishops had converted to Lutheranism, or (3) because the cathedral capitular canons, responsible for electing new bishops, had adopted Lutheranism and thus chose fellow faithful candidates, who thus de facto ascended the sees (typical for prince-bishoprics in Northern Germany).

So while the area under the jurisdiction of the vicar apostolic followed originally the diocesan boundaries of the de facto defunct bishoprics, the boundaries of new jurisdictions followed mostly the political borders relevant at the time of their establishment (See the list in the section States and territories covered by the vicariate below).

The scattered Catholics in Northern Europe were placed under the pastoral care of the Jesuits, Franciscans and Dominicans. Catholics in many places had at their disposal only the chapels established in the houses of the diplomatic representatives of the Holy Roman (becoming – as of 1806 – the Austrian) Emperor and of other Catholic Powers, France and Spain. Sometimes admission even to these chapels was rendered difficult, or entirely prohibited to native Catholics.

In some districts the conversion of the monarchs, e.g. Duke John Frederick of Brunswick and Lunenburg, Prince of Calenberg (1651) and Duke Christian I Louis of Mecklenburg-Schwerin (1663), brought Catholics some measure of freedom. The number of Catholics having increased in 1667, chiefly through the above-mentioned Prince of Calenberg, a vicariate Apostolic was established for Northern Germany.

The first vicar was Valerio Maccioni, titular Bishop of Morocco, who resided at Hanover. He died in 1676, and was succeeded by the celebrated Danish convert Nicolaus Steno, who in 1680 was obliged to leave Hanover, was made Auxiliary Bishop of Münster, and in 1683 returned to the Nordic Missions. He died at Schwerin in 1686, and was followed in the vicariate successively by Friedrich von Hörde, Auxiliary Bishop of Hildesheim and titular Bishop of Joppe (1686–96), Jobst Edmund von Brabeck, Bishop of Hildesheim (1697–1702) and Otto von Bronckhorst, Auxiliary Bishop of Osnabrück.

The Northern Missions, viewed in a wider sense, included also the Apostolic Prefectures of Schleswig-Holstein, coinciding with the Prussian province of that name, of Denmark and of Norway, which were placed under separate prelates in 1868. The vicariate and prefectures were under the permanent jurisdiction of the Bishop of Osnabrück as administrator Apostolic. In the vicariate, corresponding mostly to the Prussian province of Schleswig-Holstein, Catholics numbered about 79,400 (with 1,925,000 members of other confessional denominations), under 47 secular priests having care of 17 parishes and 17 mission stations. The following religious congregations had houses in the vicariate: Sisters of Mercy of St. Charles Borromeo, 1; Sisters of St. Elizabeth (Grey Nuns), 5; Franciscan Sisters, 2; Ursulines, 2. The Prefecture Apostolic of Schleswig-Holstein had in 1909: 11 parishes, 31 mission stations, 34 secular priests, 35,900 Catholics, and 550,000 of other beliefs; 4 communities of Sisters of St. Elizabeth and 3 of Franciscan nuns.

In summer the Catholic population in the vicariate of Northern Germany and prefecture of Schleswig-Holstein was increased by 17,000 to 20,000 labourers (chiefly Poles) from other parts of Germany, who returned to their homes at the beginning of the winter. The spiritual interests of the faithful were inadequately attended to owing to the extent of the parishes, the lack of priests, the poverty of the majority of the Catholics and in many places the hostility of the Protestant state or municipal governments. A more encouraging picture was presented by the numerous Catholic societies and by the maintenance of private Catholic schools, despite the fact that the Catholics were often obliged to contribute also to the support of the state and Protestant parish schools. A very fruitful activity has been developed in these missions by the Boniface Association.

The French Revolution and the Napoleonic regime brought great relief to Catholics in many cities and states; but the equality granted them by law in some countries was often merely theoretical.

At the reorganisation of Catholic affairs in Germany after the Napoleonic era (see Rheinbund), the greater part of the Northern Missions was added to adjacent bishoprics. The only districts remaining mission territory were the Kingdom of Saxony, the Principality of Anhalt, constituted separate vicariates Apostolic since 1743 (Apostolic Vicariate of Saxony) and 1825 respectively, and the North, which in 1826 was placed temporarily under the jurisdiction of the Bishop of Paderborn.

In 1839 Pope Gregory XVI wished to entrust the vicariate to a bishop with his see at Hamburg. Johann Theodor Laurent was appointed vicar and consecrated bishop. Lutheran opposition prevented the realisation of the plan and Laurent was denied to enter Hamburg. The pope thereupon gave the administration of the vicariate to the Auxiliary Bishop of Osnabrück, Karl Anton Lüpke (d. 1855). The Bishop of Osnabrück has since then been the regular Vicar Apostolic of the Northern Missions, and administrator of the Prefecture Apostolic of Schleswig-Holstein since its separation from the vicariate in 1868. In 1869 Denmark and Norway were erected into apostolic prefectures of their own, and in 1892 into apostolic vicariates.

== Defunct dioceses comprised in the vicariate ==
On its establishment the Apostolic Vicariate comprised first only the Diocese of Minden. The other former Catholic dioceses followed at three later dates (given in the list). The date in the second column refers to the year, when last time a catholic bishop could effectively wield his pontificate, not an eventual later appointment or continued titulature in exile. Some last Catholic bishops (like in Minden and Verden) had already been preceded by Lutheran incumbents.

The list below records the bishoprics whose diocesan areas fell under the jurisdiction of the Nordic Missions (renamed into Nordic Missions of Northern Germany on 7 August 1868 on the occasion of completing separate jurisdictions for all of Scandinavia). The list shows when the various diocesan areas left the (and eventually returned to the) jurisdiction of the Nordic Missions, to which Roman Catholic jurisdictions the areas used to belong afterwards, and to which jurisdictions they belong today. Today the areas of some defunct dioceses are partitioned among several modern dioceses. By clicking on the buttons the list can be ordered along the categories given in each column. The list does not claim to record the correct affiliations for every area of the former dioceses.

Diocese (D)/ Archdiocese (A)	Last Catholic episcopate ended in	Jurisdiction by Northern Missions	Later jurisdiction(s) (Apostolic Administration/ ~ Prefecture/ ~ Vicariate = AA/AP/AV; territorial prelature = TP)	Today's jurisdiction(s)	Pre-Reformation ecclesiastical province; remarks
Minden (D)	1648	1667–1709, and again 1780–1821	Upper and Lower Saxony (AV) 1709–1780 (seated in Hanover, thus also called Apostolic Vicariate of Hanover)	Paderborn (D/A as of 1930) since 1821	Minden was suffragan to Cologne (A)
Halberstadt (D)	1552	1669–1709, and again 1780–1821	Upper and Lower Saxony (AV) 1709–1780; Paderborn (D/A as of 1930) 1821–1994	Magdeburg (D) since 1994	Halberstadt was suffragan to Mainz (A)
Verden (D)	1631	1669–1709, and again 1780–1821/24	Upper and Lower Saxony (AV) 1709–1780 (western, i.e. Hanoveran part); Paderborn (D/A as of 1930) 1821–1994 (Old March)	Hildesheim (D) since 1824 (western, i.e. Lower Saxon part); Magdeburg (D) since 1994 (Old March)	Verden was suffragan to Mainz (A)
Bremen (A)	1566	1670–1821/24, partially till 1868 and 1930	Schleswig-Holstein (AP) 1868–1930 (Holstein); Osnabrück (D) 1930–1994 (Hamburg and Holstein)	Hildesheim (D) since 1824 (Elbe-Weser Triangle); Osnabrück (D) since 1930 (Bremen city w/o Bremen Nord); Münster (D) since 1821 (west part, i.e. Oldenburg); Hamburg (A) since 1994 (Holstein and Hamburg)	Bremen's former diocesan area is partitioned between four dioceses
Lübeck (D)	1561	1670–1930	Osnabrück (D) 1930–1994	Hamburg (A) since 1994	Lübeck was suffragan to Bremen (A)
Ratzeburg (D)	1554	1670–1930	Osnabrück (D) 1930–1994	Hamburg (A) since 1994	Ratzeburg was suffragan to Bremen (A)
Schwerin (D)	1533	1670–1930	Osnabrück (D) 1930–1994	Hamburg (A) since 1994	Schwerin was suffragan to Bremen (A)
Magdeburg (A)	1552	1670–1709, and again 1780–1821, Anhalt till 1825	Upper and Lower Saxony (AV) 1709–1780; Paderborn (D/A as of 1930) 1821–1994 (Prussian part); Anhalt (AV) 1825–1921 (Anhalt); Paderborn (D/A as of 1930) 1921–1994 (Anhalt)	Magdeburg (D) since 1994	Magdeburg was reestablished as diocese in 1994
Brandenburg (D)	1539	1670–1709, and again 1780–1821	Upper and Lower Saxony (AV) 1709–1780; Breslau's (D) Prince-Episcopal Delegation for Brandenburg and Pomerania 1821–1930	Berlin (D/A as of 1994) since 1930	Brandenburg was suffragan to Magdeburg (A)
Havelberg (D)	1548	1670–1709, and again 1780–1821	Upper and Lower Saxony (AV) 1709–1780; Breslau's (D) Prince-Episcopal Delegation for Brandenburg and Pomerania 1821–1930	Berlin (D/A as of 1994) since 1930	Havelberg was suffragan to Magdeburg (A)
Lebus (D)	1555	1670–1709, and again 1780–1821	Upper and Lower Saxony (AV) 1709–1780; Breslau's (D) Prince-Episcopal Delegation for Brandenburg and Pomerania 1821–1930; Berlin (D) 1930–1951 (eastern part); Cammin, Lebus and Schneidemühl Prelature (AA) 1951–1972 (eastern, i.e. Polish part)	Berlin (D/A as of 1994) since 1930 (western part) (Zielona Góra-)Gorzów (D) since 1972 (eastern, i.e. Polish part)	Lebus was suffragan to Magdeburg (A)
Merseburg (D)	1544	1670–1709	Upper and Lower Saxony (AV) 1709–1743; Saxon Hereditary Lands (AV) 1743–1921 (eastern part); Saxon Hereditary Lands (AV) 1743–1821 (western part); Paderborn (D/A as of 1930) 1821–1994 (western, i.e. Prussian part)	(Dresden-)Meissen (D) since 1921 (eastern part); Magdeburg (D) since 1994 (western, i.e. Saxony-Anhalt part)	Merseburg was suffragan to Magdeburg (A)
Naumburg (D)	1564	1670–1709	Upper and Lower Saxony (AV) 1709–1743; Saxon Hereditary Lands (AV) 1743–1921 (eastern part); Saxon Hereditary Lands (AV) 1743–1821 (western part); Paderborn (D/A as of 1930) 1821–1994 (western, i.e. Prussian part)	(Dresden-)Meissen (D) since 1921 (eastern part); Magdeburg (D) since 1994 (western, i.e. Saxony-Anhalt part)	Naumburg was suffragan to Magdeburg (A)
Cammin (D)	1544	1688–1709, and again 1780–1821, M.-Strelitz till 1930	Upper and Lower Saxony (AV) 1709–1780; Breslau's (D) Prince-Episcopal Delegation for Brandenburg and Pomerania 1821–1930 (New March and Pomerania); Berlin (D) 1930–1951 (Farther Pomerania); Cammin, Lebus and Schneidemühl Prelature (AA) 1951–1972 (Farther Pomerania); Osnabrück (D) 1930–1994 (Mecklenburg-Strelitz)	Berlin (D/A as of 1994) since 1930 (Hither Pomerania); Szczecin-Kamień (D/A as of 1992) since 1972 (western Farther Pomerania); Koszalin-Kołobrzeg (D) since 1972 (eastern Farther Pomerania); Hamburg (A) since 1994 (Mecklenburg-Strelitz)	Cammin was an exempt diocese since 1140
Lund (A)	1536	1688–1783, Bornholm till 1868	Sweden (AV) 1783–1953 (Swedish part); Denmark (AP) 1868–1892 (Bornholm); Denmark (AV) 1892–1953 (Bornholm)	Stockholm (D) since 1953 (Swedish part); Copenhagen (D) since 1953 (Bornholm)	Lund was suffragan to Bremen till 1104, then elevated to archdiocese
Aarhus (D)	1536	1688–1868	Denmark (AP) 1868–1892; Denmark (AV) 1892–1953	Copenhagen (D) since 1953	Aarhus was suffragan to Lund
Børglum (D)	1536	1688–1868	Denmark (AP) 1868–1892; Denmark (AV) 1892–1953	Copenhagen (D) since 1953	Børglum was suffragan to Lund
Odense (D)	1529	1688–1868	Denmark AP) 1868–1892; Denmark (AV) 1892–1953	Copenhagen (D) since 1953	Odense was suffragan to Lund
Ribe (D)	1536	1688–1868	Denmark (AP) 1868–1892; Denmark (AV) 1892–1953	Copenhagen (D) since 1953	Ribe was suffragan to Lund
Roskilde (D)	1529	1688–1868, Rügen only till 1821	Denmark (AP) 1868–1892 (Danish part); Denmark (AV) 1892–1953 (Danish part); Breslau's (D) Prince-Episcopal Delegation for Brandenburg and Pomerania 1821–1930 (Rügen)	Copenhagen (D) since 1953 (Danish part); Berlin (D/A as of 1994) since 1930 (Rügen)	Roskilde was suffragan to Lund
Schleswig (D)	1542	1688–1868	Schleswig-Holstein (AP) 1868–1920; Schleswig-Holstein (AP) 1920–1930 (South Schleswig); Osnabrück (D) 1930–1994 (South Schleswig); Denmark (AV) 1920–1953 (North Schleswig)	Copenhagen (D) since 1953 (North Schleswig); Hamburg (A) since 1994 (South Schleswig)	Schleswig was suffragan to Lund
Viborg (D)	1536	1688–1868	Denmark (AP) 1868–1892; Denmark (AV) 1892–1953	Copenhagen (D) since 1953	Viborg was suffragan to Lund
Meissen (D)	1559/1581	1688–1709 (western part)	Meissen (AA) 1560–1567 (eastern part, i.e. Lower and Upper Lusatia, seated in Bautzen); Upper Lusatia (AP) 1567–1921 (Upper Lusatia, reduced for Lower Lusatia and Silesian Upper Lusatia in 1821); Upper and Lower Saxony (AV) 1709–1743 (western part); Saxon Hereditary Lands (AV) 1743–1921 (western part); Breslau (D/A as of 1930) 1821–1972 (Silesian Upper Lusatia and Lower Lusatia); Görlitz (AA) 1972–1994	(Dresden-)Meissen (D) since 1921 (western part and Saxon Upper Lusatia); Görlitz (D) since 1994 (Lower Lusatia and Silesian Upper Lusatia)	Meissen was an exempt diocese (1399–1560), and since re-establishment in 1921, renamed to Dresden-Meissen in 1980, it is suffragan to Berlin (A) since 1994.
Trondheim (A)	1546	1688–1834	Sweden (AV) 1834–1868; Norway (AP) 1868–1892; Norway (AV) 1892–1931 (1931: Norway (AV) divided, Trondheim region is "Central Norway"); Missionary District of Central Norway 1931–1935; Central Norway (AP) 1935–1953; Central Norway (AV) 1953–1979	Trondheim (TP) since 1979	Originally called Nidaros, it was suffragan to Bremen till 1104, then of Lund, and elevated to archdiocese in 1152
Bergen (D)	1535	1688–1834	Sweden (AV) 1834–1868; Norway (AP) 1868–1892; Norway (AV) 1892–1931; Oslo (AV) 1931–1953	Oslo (D) since 1953	Bergen was suffragan to Trondheim
Faroe (D)	1538	1688–1855	North Pole (AP) 1855–1869; Denmark (AP) 1869–1892; Denmark (AV) 1892–1953	Copenhagen (D) since 1953	Faroe diocese was suffragan to Trondheim
Garðar (D)	1537 (however, sede vacante in 16th century)	1688–1855	North Pole (AP) 1855–1869; Denmark (AP) 1869–1892; Denmark (AV) 1892–1953	Copenhagen (D) since 1953	Garðar was suffragan to Trondheim
Hamar (D)	1537	1688–1834	Sweden (AV) 1834–1868; Norway (AP) 1868–1892; Norway (AV) 1892–1931; Oslo (AV) 1931–1953	Oslo (D) since 1953	Hamar was suffragan to Trondheim
Hólar (D)	1550	1688–1855	North Pole (AP) 1855–1869; Denmark (AP) 1869–1892; Denmark (AV) 1892–1923; Iceland (AP) 1923–1929; Iceland (AA) 1929–1968.	Reykjavík (D) since 1968	Hólar was suffragan to Trondheim
Oslo (D)	1537	1688–1834	Sweden (AV) 1834–1868; Norway (AP) 1868–1892; Norway (AV) 1892–1931; Oslo (AV) 1931–1953	Oslo (D) since 1953	Ancient Oslo was suffragan to Trondheim, modern Oslo is exempt
Skálholt (D)	1541	1688–1855	North Pole (AP) 1855–1869; Denmark (AP) 1869–1892; Denmark (AV) 1892–1923; Iceland (AP) 1923–1929; Iceland (AA) 1929–1968.	Reykjavík (D) since 1968	Skálholt was suffragan to Trondheim
Stavanger (D)	1537	1688–1834	Sweden (AV) 1834–1868; Norway (AP) 1868–1892; Norway (AV) 1892–1931; Oslo (AV) 1931–1953	Oslo (D) since 1953	Stavanger was suffragan to Trondheim
Uppsala (A)	1524	1688–1783	Sweden (AV) 1783–1953	Stockholm (D) since 1953	Uppsala was suffragan to Lund till 1164, then elevated to archdiocese
Åbo (D) (Finnish: Turku)	1550	1688–1783	Sweden (AV) 1783–1809; Mohilev (A) 1809–1920 (then seated in St. Petersburg); Finland (AV) 1920–1955	Helsinki (D) since 1955	Åbo was suffragan to Uppsala (A)
Linköping (D)	1527	1688–1783	Sweden (AV) 1783–1953	Stockholm (D) since 1953	Linköping was suffragan to Uppsala (A)
Skara (D)	1521	1688–1783	Sweden (AV) 1783–1953	Stockholm (D) since 1953	Skara was suffragan to Uppsala (A)
Strängnäs (D)	1536	1688–1783	Sweden (AV) 1783–1953	Stockholm (D) since 1953	Strängnäs was suffragan to Uppsala (A)
Västerås (D)	1534	1688–1783	Sweden (AV) 1783–1953	Stockholm (D) since 1953	Västerås was suffragan to Uppsala (A)
Växjö (D)	1530	1688–1783	Sweden (AV) 1783–1953	Stockholm (D) since 1953	Växjö was suffragan to Uppsala (A)

== States and territories covered by the vicariate ==
The states and territories covered by the vicariate altered over the long duration of its existence. So the table below tries to present those states and territories which were part of the vicariate before it was territorially reduced for the first time on 6 April 1709.

Owing to its vast extent, Pope Clement XI divided the old Vicariate Apostolic into two vicariates: the Vicariate Apostolic of Upper and Lower Saxony, embracing the portions of the old vicariate situated in the Palatinate and in Lower Saxon Electoral Hanover and the Duchy of Bremen (with the Westphalian Principality of Verden), as well as in Upper Saxon Anhalt (in its then four princely subdivisions), Electoral Brandenburg (comprising the March of Brandenburg and Farther Pomerania), Swedish Hither Pomerania, and Electoral Saxony (still without the 1635-acquired Bohemian fief of Upper and Lower Lusatia). This new Apostolic Vicariate was seated in Hanover city (and thus also called Apostolic Vicariate of Hanover). It was placed in charge of Agostino Steffani, Bishop of Spiga and minister of the Elector Palatine, as vicar Apostolic.

So the rest of the original vicariate, comprising all of Northern Europe north of the Elbe, and Bremen, remained with the Nordic Missions, which retained the title of Vicariate of the North. It was placed under the Auxiliary Bishop of Osnabrück. Since 1743 the Roman Catholics in the Wettin-held imperial fief of Electorate of Saxony were subject to the Apostolic Vicariate of the Saxon Hereditary Lands, later also acceded by Reuss Elder Line, Reuss Younger Line, and Saxe-Altenburg. Saxon Hereditary Lands merged with the Apostolic Prefecture of Upper Lusatia (comprising the post-Napoleonic remainder of Wettin-held Upper Lusatia) into the new Diocese of Meissen on 24 June 1921.

The division between the Nordic Missions and the Upper and Lower Saxon vicariate lasted until 1779/80, when Friedrich Wilhelm von Westphalen, Prince-Bishop of Hildesheim, reunited under his administration the vicariates. On 11 February 1780 the territorially lessened Vicariate of Upper and Lower Saxony remerged into the Nordic Missions. Three years later the Apostolic Vicariate of Sweden was established, then competent for Roman Catholics in the Swedish Empire with Finland and Sweden proper. The Swedish-held imperial fief in Hither Pomerania remained with the Nordic Missions, also after it became Prussian in 1815.

With Pomerania and the March of Brandenburg having ceased to be parts of the Holy Roman Empire in 1806, but become provinces of Prussia, the latter agreed with the Holy See to place the Prussian part of the Nordic Missions under the jurisdictions of neighbouring Prussian dioceses as of 16 August 1821. Thus the Prince-Bishop of Breslau took direct responsibility for the now Prussian-held part of Meissen's former diocesan areas in then Brandenburgian Lower Lusatia and then Silesian (eastern) Upper Lusatia. Breslau wielded its indirect jurisdiction in the remainder of Brandenburg (including Berlin) and most of Pomerania (except of Lauenburg and Bütow Land) by its new Prince-Episcopal Delegation for Brandenburg and Pomerania (staffed in 1824). The diocesan areas of the defunct bishoprics in Prussian Saxony came under the jurisdiction of the Diocese of Paderborn, as was the case with the diocesan area of defunct Minden in Prussian Westphalia.

Also in the Kingdom of Hanover the diocesan areas of defunct bishoprics (Bremen, Verden) were assigned to the neighbouring existing dioceses of Hildesheim and of Osnabrück on 26 March 1824 (Bull "Impensa Romanorum Pontificum").

Also Brunswick (succeeding Brunswick-Wolfenbüttel) and meanwhile only tripartite Anhalt left the Nordic Missions in 1825, but without a persisting domestic Catholic diocese and only few domestic Catholics they formed an Apostolic Vicariate of their own, also acceded by Saxe-Gotha, Schwarzburg-Rudolstadt, and Schwarzburg-Sondershausen. In 1834 Brunswick, leaving Anhalt apostolic vicariate, merged into the jurisdiction of neighbouring Hanoveran Hildesheim diocese and Norway, leaving the Nordic Missions, became part of the Swedish vicariate the same year. In 1855 northern Norway switched to the Apostolic Prefecture of the North Pole, while the rest of Norway remained with Sweden until 1868. At this time all of Northern Europe formed separate Roman Catholic jurisdictions and had left the Nordic Missions:

- Apostolic Vicariate of Sweden (already est. on 23 September 1783)
- Metropolitan Archdiocese of Mohilev (competent for Finland since the Russian takeover in 1809)
- Apostolic Prefecture of Schleswig-Holstein (est. on 29 July 1868; however, yet without Saxe-Lauenburg, Lübeck free city and Lübeck principality),
- Apostolic Prefecture of Denmark (est. on 7 August 1868; with Faroe Islands, Greenland and Iceland)
- Apostolic Prefecture of Norway (est. on 7 August 1868)

Simultaneously with the establishment of the Danish and Norwegian apostolic prefectures the Nordic Missions had been reduced to small member states in the North German Confederation (thus renamed to Apostolic Vicariate of Northern Germany on 7 August 1868), such as the Grand Duchies of Mecklenburg-Schwerin and Mecklenburg-Strelitz, the Duchy of Saxe-Lauenburg (part of Prussia as of 1876), the Hanseatic free cities of Bremen (without Bremerhaven), Hamburg (still with Cuxhaven) and Lübeck, the Principalities of Lübeck (capital Eutin), and Schaumburg-Lippe, and the British Island of Helgoland (joined Germany in 1891).

The table below shows the territories and states at the beginning of the 18th century and how new jurisdictions developed over the centuries. The table can be sorted by the territories and states, the empires they used to belonged to, the years they belonged to the Apostolic Vicariate of the Nordic Missions, and the names of the present jurisdictions by clicking on the buttons.

Territory or state	Defunct dioceses comprised (totally/ mostly/ partially: t/m/p)	Jurisdiction by Northern Missions	Later jurisdiction(s) (Apostolic Administration/ ~ Prefecture/ ~ Vicariate = AA/AP/AV; territorial prelature = TP)	Today's jurisdiction(s)	In early 18th century affiliated with
Anhalt-Bernburg	Halberstadt (p); Magdeburg (A) (p)	1669–1709, 1670–1709 (Magdeburg) and both again 1780–1825	Upper and Lower Saxony (AV) 1709–1780; Anhalt (AV) 1825–1921; Paderborn (D/A as of 1930) 1921–1994	Magdeburg (D) since 1994	Anhalt-Bernburg was part of the Holy Roman Empire
Anhalt-Dessau	Halberstadt (p); Magdeburg (A) (p)	1669–1709, 1670–1709 (Magdeburg) and both again 1780–1825	Upper and Lower Saxony (AV) 1709–1780; Anhalt (AV) 1825–1921; Paderborn (D/A as of 1930) 1921–1994	Magdeburg (D) since 1994	Anhalt-Dessau was part of the Holy Roman Empire
Anhalt-Köthen	Halberstadt (p); Magdeburg (A) (p)	1669–1709, 1670–1709 (Magdeburg) and both again 1780–1825	Upper and Lower Saxony (AV) 1709–1780; Anhalt (AV) 1825–1921; Paderborn (D/A as of 1930) 1921–1994	Magdeburg (D) since 1994	Anhalt-Köthen was part of the Holy Roman Empire
Anhalt-Zerbst	Bremen (A) (p: Jever); Halberstadt (p); Magdeburg (A) (p)	1669–1709, 1670–1709 (Magdeburg) and both again 1780–1821/25	Upper and Lower Saxony (AV) 1709–1780; Anhalt (AV) 1825–1921; Paderborn (D/A as of 1930) 1921–1994	Münster (D) since 1821 (Jever, meanwhile Oldenburgian); Magdeburg (D) since 1994 (Anhalt proper)	Anhalt-Zerbst was part of the Holy Roman Empire
Brandenburg, (electorate) (March of Brandenburg proper and Brandenburgian Pomerania), in personal union with Prussia	Brandenburg (D) (t); Cammin (m: New March and Farther Pomerania); Havelberg (t); Lebus (t); Verden (D) (p: Old March)	1670–1709, 1688–1708 (Cammin), and all again 1780–1821	Upper and Lower Saxony (AV) 1709–1780; Breslau's (D) Prince-Episcopal Delegation for Brandenburg and Pomerania 1821–1930 (Brandenburg w/o Lower Lusatia, Pomerania, both later reduced for Polish-annexed areas east of Oder-Neisse line); Cammin, Lebus and Schneidemühl Prelature (AA) 1951–1972 (Polish East Brandenburg and Polish Farther Pomerania)	Berlin (D/A as of 1994) since 1930 (Berlin city-state, Brandenburg w/o Lower Lusatia, and Prussian Pomerania, the latter two later reduced to modern Brandenburg and Hither Pomerania after Polish annexations) (Zielona Góra-)Gorzów (D) since 1972 (Polish East Brandenburg); Szczecin-Kamień (D/A as of 1992) since 1972 (western Farther Pomerania); Koszalin-Kołobrzeg (D) since 1972 (eastern Farther Pomerania)	Brandenburg with its part of Pomerania was part of the Holy Roman Empire
Bremen, free imperial city (w/o Bremen Nord and Bremerhaven)	Bremen (A) (p)	1670–1709, and again 1780–1930	Upper and Lower Saxony (AV) 1709–1780	Osnabrück (D) since 1930	Bremen city was part of the Holy Roman Empire
Bremen, duchy, in personal union with Sweden	Verden (D) (p); Bremen (A) (p)	1669–1721, 1670–1721 (Bremen), and both again 1780–1824	Upper and Lower Saxony (AV) 1709–1780	Hildesheim (D) since 1824	Bremen duchy was part of the Holy Roman Empire
Brunswick and Lunenburg, electorate (Hanover), in personal union with Great Britain	Verden (D) (m); Halberstadt (D) (p)	1669–1709, 1670–1709 (Halberstadt), and both again 1780–1824	Upper and Lower Saxony (AV) 1709–1780	Hildesheim (D) since 1824	Hanover electorate was part of the Holy Roman Empire
Brunswick and Lunenburg, duchy (Wolfenbüttel)	Minden (D) (p); Halberstadt (D) (p); Hildesheim's (D) (p), jurisdiction denied since 1568; Mainz' (A) (p), jurisdiction denied since 1568; Paderborn's (D) (p), jurisdiction denied since 1568	1667–1709, 1669–1709 (Halberstadt), and all again 1780–1834	Upper and Lower Saxony (AV) 1709–1780	Hildesheim (D) since 1834	Wolfenbüttel duchy was part of the Holy Roman Empire
Denmark	Aarhus (t); Børglum (t); Lund (p: Bornholm); Odense (t); Ribe (t); Roskilde (m: w/o Rügen); Viborg (t)	1688–1868	Denmark (AP) 1868–1892; Denmark (AV) 1892–1953	Copenhagen (D) since 1953	Denmark was part of Denmark–Norway
Faroe Islands	Faroe (D) (t)	1688–1855	North Pole (AP) 1855–1869; Denmark (AP) 1869–1892; Denmark (AV) 1892–1953	Copenhagen (D) since 1953	The Faroe Islands were part of Denmark–Norway
Finland	Åbo (t) (Finnish: Turku)	1688–1783	Sweden (AV) 1783–1809; Mohilev (A) 1809–1920 (then in St. Petersburg); Finland (AV) 1920–1955	Helsinki (D) since 1955	Finland was part of the Swedish Empire
Greenland	Garðar (D) (t)	1688–1855	North Pole (AP) 1855–1869; Denmark (AP) 1869–1892; Denmark (AV) 1892–1953	Copenhagen (D) since 1953	Denmark was part of Denmark–Norway
Hamburg, free imperial city (in its pre-1937 borders)	Bremen (A) (p)	1670–1709; and again 1780–1930	Upper and Lower Saxony (AV) 1709–1780; Osnabrück (D) 1930–1994	Hamburg (A) since 1994	Hamburg was part of the Holy Roman Empire
Holstein, a royal Danish-ducal Gottorpian condominium	Bremen (A) (p)	1670–1868	Schleswig-Holstein (AP) 1868–1930; Osnabrück (D) 1930–1994	Hamburg (A) since 1994	Holstein was part of the Holy Roman Empire
Iceland	Hólar (t); Skálholt (t)	1688–1855	North Pole (AP) 1855–1869; Denmark (AP) 1869–1892; Denmark (AV) 1892–1923; Iceland (AP) 1923–1929; Iceland (AA) 1929–1968.	Reykjavík (D) since 1968	Iceland was part of Denmark–Norway
Lübeck, free imperial city	Lübeck (D) (p)	1670–1930	Osnabrück (D) 1930–1994	Hamburg (A) since 1994	Lübeck city was part of the Holy Roman Empire
Lübeck, Lutheran prince-bishopric	Lübeck (D) (m)	1670–1930	Osnabrück (D) 1930–1994	Hamburg (A) since 1994	Lübeck prince-bishopric was part of the Holy Roman Empire
Mecklenburg-Schwerin	Ratzeburg (D) (p); Schwerin (D) (t)?	1670–1930	Osnabrück (D) 1930–1994	Hamburg (A) since 1994	Mecklenburg-Schwerin was part of the Holy Roman Empire
Mecklenburg-Strelitz	Ratzeburg (D) (p); Cammin (p)	1670–1930 1688–1930 (Cammin)	Osnabrück (D) 1930–1994	Hamburg (A) since 1994	Mecklenburg-Strelitz was part of the Holy Roman Empire
Norway	Bergen (D) (t); Hamar (D) (t); Oslo (D) (t); Stavanger (D) (t); Trondheim (t)	1688–1834	Sweden (AV) 1834–1868 (1855: Norway north of Arctic Circle separated from Sweden (AV) as...); North Pole (AP) 1855–1868 (1868: all of Norway united as...); Norway (AP) 1868–1892; Norway (AV) 1892–1931 (1931: Norway (AV) split into three jurisdictions) (southern Norway:); Oslo (AV) 1931–1953 (central Norway:); Missionary District of Central Norway 1931–1935; Central Norway (AP) 1935–1953; Central Norway (AV) 1953–1979 (Norway north of polar circle:); Missionary District of Northern Norway 1931–1944; Northern Norway (AP) 1944–1955; Northern Norway (AV) 1955–1979	Oslo (D) since 1953 (all of southern Norway); Trondheim (TP) since 1979 (all of central Norway); Tromsø (TP) since 1979 (Norway north of polar circle)	Norway was part of Denmark–Norway
Oldenburg, duchy, in personal union with Denmark-Norway	Bremen (A) (p)	1670–1709, and again 1780–1821	Upper and Lower Saxony (AV) 1709–1780	Münster (D) since 1821	Oldenburg was part of the Holy Roman Empire
Pomerania, Swedish, in personal union with Sweden	Cammin (p); Roskilde (p: Rügen)	1688–1709, and again 1780–1821	Upper and Lower Saxony (AV) 1709–1780; Breslau's (D) Prince-Episcopal Delegation for Brandenburg and Pomerania 1821–1930	Berlin (D/A as of 1994) since 1930	Swedish Pomerania was part of the Holy Roman Empire
Saxe-Lauenburg, in personal union with Hanover-Britain	Ratzeburg (D) (p)	1670–1930	Osnabrück (D) 1930–1994	Hamburg (A) since 1994	Saxe-Lauenburg was part of the Holy Roman Empire
Saxony, electorate	Meissen (D) (t); Merseburg (p); Naumburg (p)	1677–1709, 1688–1709 (Meissen western part), and all again 1780–1821	Meissen (AA) 1560–1567 (Lower and Upper Lusatia, seated in Bautzen); Upper Lusatia (AP) 1567–1921 (Upper Lusatia, w/o Silesian Upper ~ + Lower Lusatia since 1821); Upper and Lower Saxony (AV) 1709–1743 (rest of Saxony); Saxon Hereditary Lands (AV) 1743–1921 (rest of Albertine Saxony, reduced by Prussian annexations in 1815); Breslau (D/A as of 1930) 1821–1972 (Silesian Upper Lusatia and Lower Lusatia); Görlitz (AA) 1972–1994 (Lower Lusatia and Silesian Upper Lusatia); Paderborn (D/A as of 1930) 1821–1994 (Prussian Saxony)	(Dresden-)Meissen (D) since 1921 (then Saxony and eastern parts of Thuringia); Görlitz (D) since 1994 (Lower Lusatia and Silesian Upper Lusatia); Magdeburg (D) since 1994 (Saxony-Anhalt)	Saxony was part of the Holy Roman Empire
Schaumburg-Lippe	Minden (D) (p)	1667–1930	Osnabrück (D) 1930–1965	Hildesheim (D) since 1965	Schaumburg-Lippe was part of the Holy Roman Empire
Schleswig, duchy	Schleswig (D) (t)	1688–1868	Schleswig-Holstein (AP) 1868–1920; Schleswig-Holstein (AP) 1920–1930 (South Schleswig); Osnabrück 1930–1994 (South Schleswig); Denmark (AV) 1920–1953 (North Schleswig)	Hamburg (A) since 1994 (South Schleswig); Copenhagen (D) since 1953 (North Schleswig)	Schleswig was part of Denmark–Norway
Sweden	Linköping (D); Lund (A) (w/o Bornholm); Skara (D); Strängnäs (D); Uppsala (A); Västerås (D); Växjö (D)	1688–1783	Sweden (AV) 1783–1953	Stockholm (D) since 1953	Core Sweden was part of the Swedish Empire
Verden, principality, in personal union with Sweden	Verden (D) (p)	1669–1721, and again 1780–1824	Upper and Lower Saxony (AV) 1709–1780	Hildesheim (D) since 1824	Verden principality was part of the Holy Roman Empire
Wismar, in personal union with Sweden	Ratzeburg (D) (p)	1670–1930	Osnabrück (D) 1930–1994	Hamburg (A) since 1994	Wismar was part of the Holy Roman Empire

== Vicars Apostolic ==
- Francis of Wartenberg (1645–1661; for the former Archdiocese of Bremen only)

=== Vicars Apostolic for the Nordic Missions ===
- 1667–1676: Valerio Maccioni
- 1677–1686: Nicolas Steno
  - 1680–1683: Ferdinand von Fürstenberg (for Bremen, Halberstadt, Magdeburg and the Mecklenburgian duchies, former dioceses of Ratzeburg and Schwerin), simultaneously Prince-Bishop of Paderborn (1661–1683) and Münster (1678–1683, died)
- 1687–1696: Friedrich von Tietzen called Schlüter
- 1697–1702: Jobst Edmund von Brabeck, simultaneously Prince-Bishop of Hildesheim (1688–1702, died)
- 1702–1713: Otto von Bronckhorst zu Gronsfeldt
- 1713–1715: Sede vacante
- 1715–1716: Johann Hugo von Gärtz
- 1716–1718: Sede vacante
- 1718–1719: Hyacinth Petit (died in 1719), simultaneously auxiliary bishop of Osnabrück and bishop of the titular see of Heliopolis in Augustamnica
- 1719–1722: Sede vacante
- 1722–1761: Johann Friedrich Adolf von Hörde, simultaneously canon at Osnabrück's St. Peter's Cathedral and bishop of the titular see of Flaviopolis (1723–1761, died)
- 1761–1774: Franz Josef von Gondola
- 1775–1789: Friedrich Wilhelm von Westphalen, simultaneously Prince-Bishop of Hildesheim (1763–1789) and Paderborn (1782–1789)
- 1789–1825: Franz Egon von Fürstenberg, simultaneously Prince-Bishop of Hildesheim (1789–1825) and Paderborn (1789-1825)
- 1825–1839: Sede vacante
- 1839–1841: Jean-Théodore Laurent (resigned after Prussian obstruction), simultaneously bishop of the titular see of Chersonesus in Creta, Vicar Apostolic of Luxembourg (1841–1848, deposed after Luxembourgian pressure, resigned in 1856)
- 1841–1921: Sede vacante
  - 1858–1895: Paulus Melchers as provicar per pro
  - 1899–1914: Heinrich Hubert Aloysius Voß as provicar per pro, simultaneously Bishop of Osnabrück (1899–1914, died)
  - 1914–1921: Wilhelm Berning as provicar per pro
- 1921–1930: Wilhelm Berning, simultaneously Bishop of Osnabrück (1914–1955, died)

=== Vicars Apostolic for Upper and Lower Saxony ===
In 1709 the Apostolic Vicariate for Upper and Lower Saxony was disentangled from the Nordic Missions.

- 1709–1722: Agostino Steffani (resigned in protest of lacking financial support from the Vatican)
- 1722–1726: Sede vacante
  - 1722–1723: Ludolf Wilhelm von Majus as provicar per pro
- 1726–1728: Agostino Steffani (returned after fulfillment of his claims)
- 1730–1745: Leopold Heinrich Wilhelm von Schorror (resigned)
- 1745–1757: Johann Wilhelm von Twickel (died in 1757)
- 1757–1760: Sede vacante
  - 1757–1759: Volradus Christian Müller as provicar per pro
  - 1759–1760: Jodokus Joseph Walmer as provicar per pro
- 1760–1779: Johann Theodor von Franken-Siersdorf (died in 1779)
- 1779–1780: Sede vacante

The remainder of the vicariate, after secession of Apostolic Vicariate in the Hereditary Lands of Saxony in 1743, remerged into the Nordic Missions in 1780.

=== Vicars Apostolic for the Saxon Hereditary Lands ===
In 1743 the Vicariate Apostolic for Saxon Hereditary Lands (or simply Apostolic Vicariate of Saxony) was disentangled from the Upper and Lower Saxony vicariate.

- 1743–1749: Ludwig Li(e)geritz
- 1749–1763: Leo Rauch
- 1763–1764: Augustin Eggs
- 1764–1800: Franz Herz (died in 1800)
- 1801–1818: Johann Alois Schneider, bishop of the titular see of Argos (1816–1818, died)
- 1819–1841: Ignaz Bernhard Mauermann (brother of the next), simultaneously bishop of the titular see of Pella, also Apostolic Prefect of Upper Lusatia (1831–1841, died; i.e. the Upper Lusatian share of defunct ancient Meissen diocese)
- 1841–1845: Franz Laurenz Mauermann (died in 1845; brother of the former), simultaneously bishop of the titular see of Rama
- 1846–1853: Joseph Dittrich (died in 1853), simultaneously Apostolic Prefect of Upper Lusatia, and bishop of the titular see of Corycus.
- 1854–1875: Ludwig Forwerk (died in 1875), simultaneously Apostolic Prefect of Upper Lusatia, and bishop of the titular see of Leontopolis in Augustamnica.
- 1876–1890: Franz Bernert (died in 1890), simultaneously Apostolic Prefect of Upper Lusatia, and bishop of the titular see of Azotus (Ashdod)
- 1890–1900: Ludwig Wahl (resigned), simultaneously Apostolic Prefect of Upper Lusatia, and bishop of the titular see of Cucusus
- 1900–1903: Sede vacante
  - 1900–1903: Carl Maaz as provicar per pro
- 1903–1905: Georg Wuschanski, simultaneously bishop of the titular see of Samos, further Apostolic Prefect of Upper Lusatia (1904–1905, died)
- 1906–1914: Aloys Schäfer (died in 1914)
- 1915–1920: Franz Löbmann (died in 1920)
- 1920–1921: Sede vacante
  - 1920–1921: Jakub Skala as provicar per pro (resigned), simultaneously Apostolic Prefect of Upper Lusatia

In 1921 the Holy See elevated the Apostolic Prefecture of Upper Lusatia to the modern Diocese of Meissen (renamed Dresden-Meissen in 1980), followed by the investiture of Christian Schreiber as bishop, the Vicariate of the Saxon Hereditary Lands was then merged into this new diocese.
