= Ancient Diocese of Odense =

Roman Catholic diocese in Denmark (c. 980 - 1536)

Diocese of Odense Dioecesis Othoniensis Odense Stift
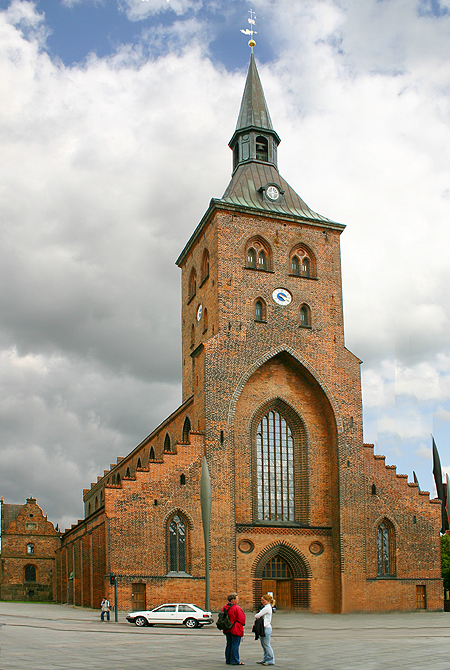
- St. Canute's Cathedral, former seat of the bishop of Odense.

Location
- Country: Denmark
- Ecclesiastical province: Lund
- Metropolitan: Archdiocese of Lund

Information
- Denomination: Roman Catholic
- Sui iuris church: Latin Church
- Rite: Roman Rite
- Established: 988
- Dissolved: 1536
- Cathedral: St. Canute's Cathedral in Odense

The former Diocese of Odense (Danish: Odense Stift) was a Roman Catholic diocese in Denmark which included the islands of Funen, Langeland, Tåsinge, Lolland, Falster, Als, and Ærø. Its episcopal see was located in Odense at St. Canute's Cathedral.

The diocese was founded before 988. At the time, it was disputed as suffragan between the archdioceses of Hamburg-Bremen and Canterbury. In 1104, it became suffragan of the Metropolitan Archbishop of Lund, along with the other dioceses in Denmark. The diocese dissolved during the Protestant Reformation in 1536. Its region was eventually absorbed by the Diocese of Funen within the Church of Denmark.

== Diocesan history ==
The diocese was founded sometime between 965 and 988. Over the course of its history there were at least 29 successive Bishops of Odense. It is possible there were more, as few records exist prior to the 12th century and there were multiple instances where the position was vacant. Even for those whose names are known, the exact dates of their accession and resignation are uncertain.

The missionary Odinkar Hvide is said to have preached on Funen at the time the diocese was established, though there is little record to confirm that he was officially the diocese's bishop. The first recorded Bishop of Odense, Reginbert, was an Englishman consecrated by Archbishop Alnoth of Canterbury ca. 1020. He was succeeded by Gilbert, a clerk of Bremen. After Gilbert's death in 1072, the diocese was vacant and subject to the Bishop of Roskilde until the appointment of an English Benedictine monk named Hubald ca. 1082.

The diocese's first church was erected in Odense and dedicated to Saint Mary. Around 1075, King Canute IV presented the diocese's cathedral, which was then under construction, with the relics of Saint Alban and Saint Oswald. On 10 July 1086, Canute was killed during an insurrection in Odense. He was soon venerated as a saint within the diocese and his remains were exhumed in April 1095 as relics. He was officially canonized by Pope Paschal II ca. 1100. On 19 April 1101, his remains were translated by Bishop Hubald to the diocese's cathedral.

Bishop Hubald died ca. 1139, and was briefly succeeded by Bishop Herman, who died shortly thereafter. Rikulf (or Ricolf) was then appointed as Bishop. Rikulf had been a respected nobleman before pursuing an ecclesiastical career, having supported King Eric III in a war of succession. During his time as bishop, the diocese was ravaged by the Danish Civil Wars. Rikulf is stated to have died in 1162 or 1163, and was succeeded around the same time by the provost at St. Alban's Church, Live. Bishop Live either died or was removed from power due to reformatory disputes some time before 1170.

Odense was once one of the wealthiest dioceses in Denmark and had strong ties to the aristocracy. During his time as bishop, Jens Andersen Beldenak came into conflict with the aristocracy, perhaps because he was the only bishop in Denmark at the time who had not been born into the nobility. As a result of these conflicts with the ruling class, he was temporarily imprisoned and eventually forced to resign in 1529. His successor, Knud Henrikssen Gyldenstjerne, was formerly the Dean of Viborg. Gyldenstjerne's election as bishop was controversially never confirmed by the pope.

Prior to the Reformation, the diocese oversaw a number of monasteries, convents, and abbeys within its domain, including Holme Abbey. These establishments followed a variety of monastic traditions. Their orders included: Augustinian Canons, Benedictines, Cistercians, Franciscans, Dominicans, Carmelites, Poor Clares, and Bridgettines. The diocese also oversaw hospitals in Odense, Assens, Faaborg and Nakskov, and a Commandery of the Knights of St. John in Odense.

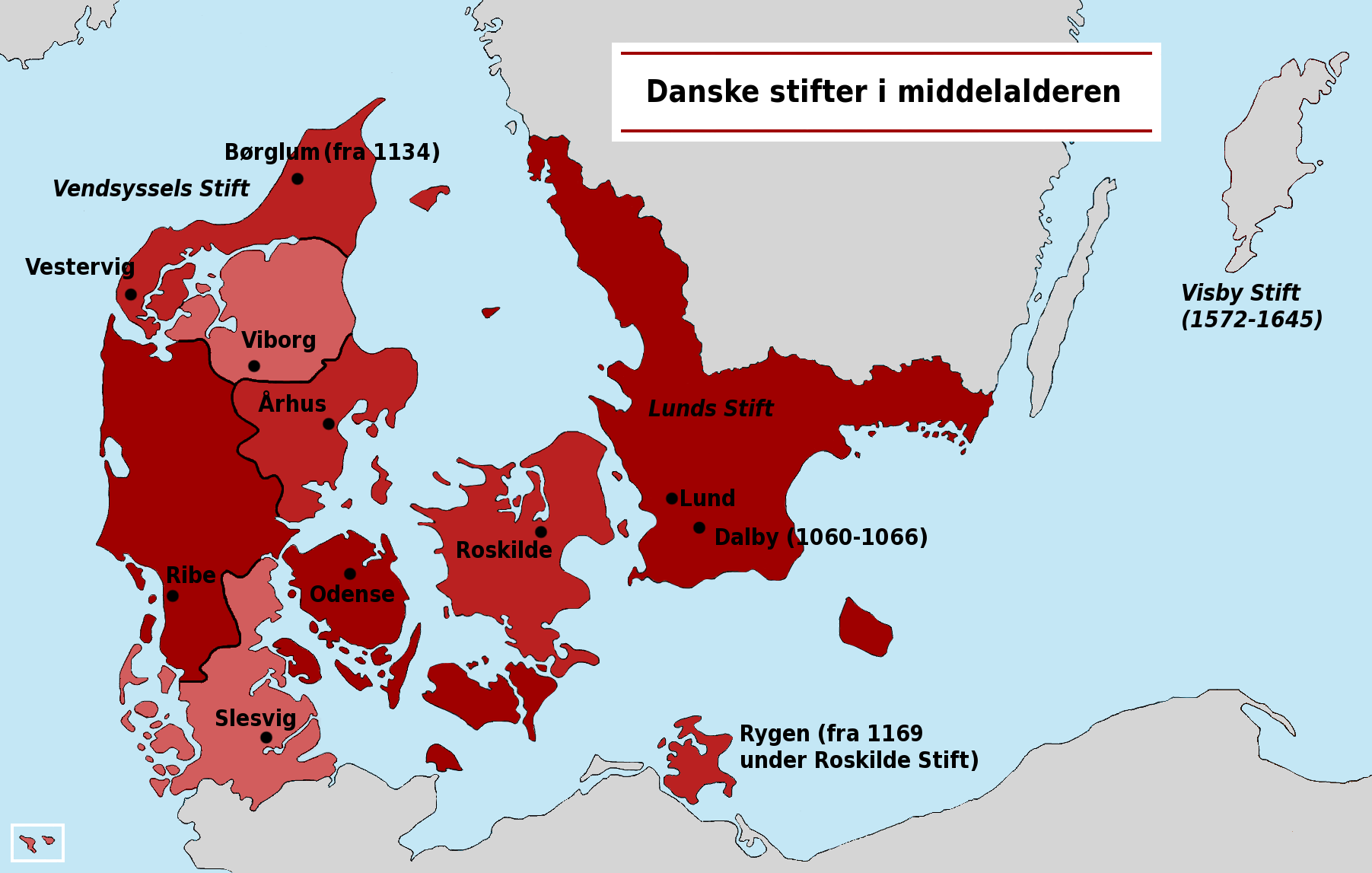
Danish Dioceses during the Middleages

== Protestant reformation ==
In 1532, the Protestant reformer Jørgen Sadolin was permitted to preach his agenda in Odense. Sadolin served as an assistant to the then Catholic Bishop of Odense, Knud Henrikssen Gyldenstjerne, which suggests that he was sympathetic or complicit to the reformers. A later document from King Christian III which denounced the Catholic Bishops deposed during the Reformation in Denmark was notably lenient towards Gyldenstjerne, saying that he was neither "significantly evangelical or papist, nor ecclesiastical or secular." Despite this, Bishop Gyldenstjerne was briefly imprisoned when the catholic diocese was dissolved in 1536. He was released in 1537 on the condition that he conform to the newly established lutheran church.

With the establishment of the Protestant Church of Denmark, the diocese was replaced by the Diocese of Funen and Jørgen Sadolin was designated as the new Protestant Bishop. The former Catholic dioceses in Denmark, including the bishopric of Odense, were never reestablished. Instead, the new Catholic missionary clergy in Denmark were made part of the Apostolic Vicariate of Northern Missions, which was established on 7 July 1868. In 1869, this vicariate was demoted as Apostolic Prefecture of Denmark. On 15 March 1892 it was promoted as Apostolic Vicariate of Denmark. Finally on April 29, 1953 it was promoted as exempt Diocese of Copenhagen, which includes the Danish territories of Greenland and the Faroe Islands.

== List of bishops ==
- Odinkar Hvide, 988–10??
- Reginbert, ca. 1020–10??
- Gilbert, 1048–1072
  - Vacant, 1072–1082
- Hubald (Humbald), 1082–c. 1139
- Hermann, c. 1139
- Ricolf (Rikulf), c. 1140–1162
- Live, 1162–c. 1170
- Simon, 1170–1186
- John I, 1186–1213
- Lojus, 1213–c. 1239
- Iver, 1239–1245
- Niels, 1245–1247
- Jacob, 1247–1252
- Regner, 1252–1266
- Peder, 1267–c. 1280
- Johannes, 1282–1286
- Gisico, 1286–c. 1304
- Peder Pagh, 1304–1339
- Niels Jonsen, 1340–1362
- Erik Johansen Krabbe, 1362–1376
- Valdemar Podubesk, 1376–1392
- Theus (Tetz) Podubesk, 1392–1400
- Jens Ovesen, 1400–1420
- Navne Jensen Gyrsting, 1421–1440
- Henneke Ulfeldt, 1440–1459
- Mogens Krafse, 1460–1474
- Karl Rønnow, 1475–1501
- Jens Andersen Beldenak, 1501–1517
  - Vacant, 1517–1523
- Jens Andersen Beldenak, 1523–1529 (Restored)
- Knud Henrikssen Gyldenstjerne, 1529–1534
- Gustav Trolle, 1534–1535
- Knud Henrikssen Gyldenstjerne, 1535–1536 (Restored)

== See also ==
- Diocese of Funen
- Reformation in Denmark–Norway and Holstein
- Roman Catholic Diocese of Copenhagen
