= Nils Johan Ekdahl =

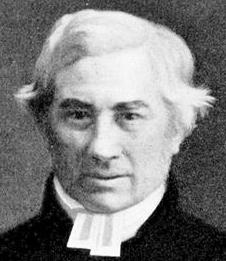
Nils Johan Ekdahl

Nils Johan Ekdahl (27 April 1799 in Fågeltofta, Sweden – 20 December 1870 in Stockholm, Sweden) was a Swedish theologian, political writer and cultural historian.

Student in Lund in 1820, ordination as pastor in 1822, employed as a preacher in Stockholm in 1825. In his spare time, he devoted himself to historical and archaeological research, and traveled from 1827 to 1830 through the landscape of Norrland in the north of Sweden, about which he reports in his treatise Om vattuminskningen i norra poltrakterna (1865). In his last years of life Ekdahl was also a staunch supporter of the Icelandic theologian Magnús Eiríksson (1806–1881), of whom he translated two books into Swedish.

== Main works ==
- Några data ur en 13:årig embetsverksamhet till förklarande af en 6 månaders ofrivillig overksamhet, Stockholm 1851.
- Högmesso-predikan på klagodagen, den 14 augusti 1859, hållen i Adolf Fredriks kyrka, Stockholm 1859.
- Den norska frågans historik, Stockholm 1860.
- Predikan vid Jubelfesten den 4 november 1864, Stockholm 1864.
- Om vattuminskningen i norra poltrakterna, dess orsaker och dess följder : embetsberättelse, Stockholm 1865.
- Om osedligheten i Stockholm och dess botemedel, Stockholm 1866.

== Secondary literature on Ekdahl ==
- Harald Ossian Wieselgren, "Ekdahl, Nils Johan," in Nordisk Familjebok: Konversationslexikon och Realencyklopedi, vol. 4, Stockholm 1881, cols. 294–295.
- P. A. Wallmark, "Ekdahl, Nils Johan," in Svenskt biografiskt handlexikon, 2. ed. 1906, vol. 1, p. 283.
