= Mogues =

- Commune
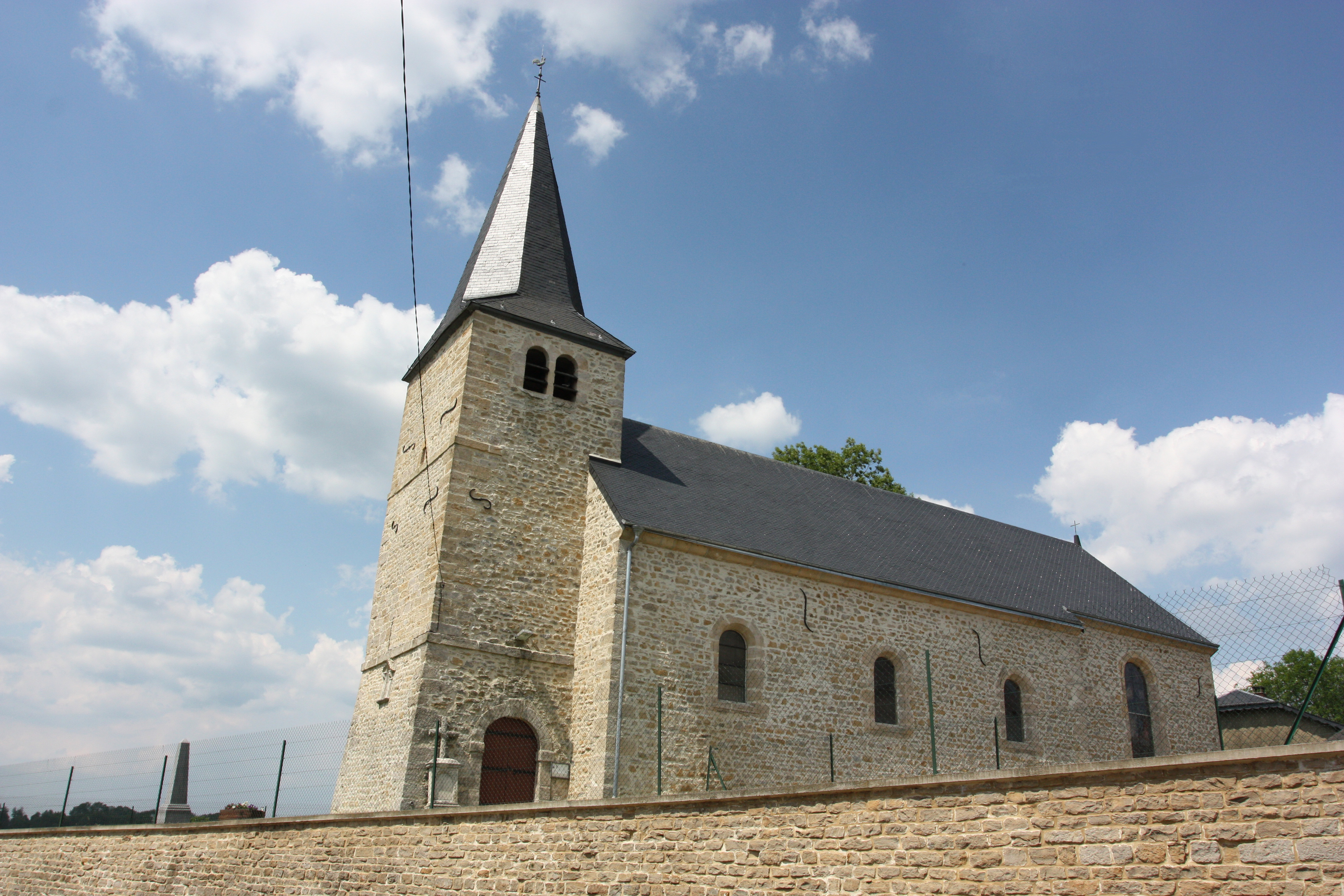
- The church in Mogues
- Location of Mogues
- Location within France Location within Grand Est
- Coordinates: 49°39′07″N 5°16′47″E
- Country: France
- Region: Grand Est
- Department: Ardennes
- Arrondissement: Sedan
- Canton: Carignan

Government
  - Mayor (2020–2026): Marc Wathy
- Area^{1}: 8.26 km^{2} (3.19 sq mi)
- Elevation: 307 m (1,007 ft)
- Population (2023): 228
  - Density: 27.6/km^{2} (71.5/sq mi)
- Time zone: UTC+01:00 (CET)
  - Summer (DST): UTC+02:00 (CEST)
- INSEE/Postal code: 08291 /08110
- ^{1} French Land Register data, which excludes lakes, ponds, glaciers > 1 km^{2} (0.386 sq mi or 247 acres) and river estuaries.

Mogues (French pronunciation: [mɔɡ]) is a commune in the Ardennes department in northern France.

== Population ==
Historical population
Year	Pop.	±% p.a.
1968	165	—
1975	168	+0.26%
1982	122	−4.47%
1990	156	+3.12%
1999	137	−1.43%
2007	144	+0.62%
2012	160	+2.13%
2017	216	+6.19%
2023	228	+0.91%
Source: INSEE

== Notable people ==
- Lambert Closse, Sergeant Major of the garrison of Ville-Marie, Canada, was born in Mogues in 1618.
- Bernard Bernard, French Catholic priest and missionary in Norway.
- Jean-André Lepaute, French clockmaker.

== See also ==
- Communes of the Ardennes department
