= Boniface Association =

German Boniface Association logo since June 2013

The Boniface Association, in German Bonifatiuswerk, is a Roman Catholic organization whose primary aim is to support Catholicism in largely Protestant areas of Germany and areas formerly part of the German empire. Founded in 1849 and still in existence, it owes its name to Saint Boniface, traditionally hailed as "The Apostle of the Germans."

== History ==
It originated from a suggestion made by Johann Joseph Ignaz von Döllinger at the Third Catholic Congress of Germany, held at Regensburg in 1849 and organized by Josef Theodor zu Stolberg-Stolberg. The object of the association is to maintain what the Catholic Church possesses in those regions where Catholics are few in number, to found and support missions and schools, and to erect churches, parish-houses and schools for Catholics in the Protestant parts of Germany. The organization is called Bonifatiusverein für das katholische Deutschland; Stollberg is elected to be its first president. Its second president was the bishop of Paderborn, Konrad Martin; since then the bishop of Paderborn is the official "protector" of the organization.

The territories which the association has taken under its especial care included in the early 20th century: the Diocese of Kulm; the Delegature of Brandenburg and Pomerania, belonging to the Prince-Bishopric of Breslau; the Vicariate Apostolic of Saxony; the Dioceses of Paderborn, Hildesheim, Osnabrück and Fulda; the Northern Missions. The association was managed by a general committee at Paderborn; the diocesan committees have entire control of the contributions they receive; after consultation with their respective diocesan councils, and under the approval of the general committee, the diocesan committees designate the objects to which the money shall be given. Millions have been collected and many churches erected or aided.

Besides the diocesan committees another important branch was formed by the Boniface collecting societies. The first of these was founded in 1885 among the merchants of Paderborn by the Marist congregation; this branch of the association was designed to care for the religious training of Catholic children in non-Catholic communities, by the founding of orphan asylums and institutions where children are prepared for their first communion, funded by the collection and sale of objects of little value in themselves, such trifles as tin-foil, old postage stamps, clothing, leaden seals, old coins, books, cigar bands and - tips. Related to the Boniface Association was the Academic Boniface Association.

Since 1860 the general association has had a printing office (the Bonifatius press) and since 1888 a bookstore for old and new publications, both at Paderborn. The popes have granted indulgences and privileges to priests connected with the association. The association started issuing the "Bonifatiusblatt" in 1850; the "Schlesisches Bonifatiusblatt", 1860 and the "St. Bonifatiusblatt" at Prague, founded in 1904.

== Recent history ==
The organization was renamed "Bonifatiuswerk der deutschen Katholiken" in 1968. In 1974 it expanded its activities to attend to the diaspora in Scandinavia, and since 1995 it is also active in Estonia and Latvia.

== Presidents ==
- Josef Theodor zu Stolberg-Stolberg (1849-1859)
- Konrad Martin (1859-1875)
- Carl Hubert Freiherr von Wendt (1876-1903)
- Hermann Joseph Graf zu Stolberg-Stolberg (1904-1925)
- Meinulf von Mallinckrodt (1926-1946)
- Georg Graf Droste zu Vischering Erbdroste (1946-1971)
- Georg Ferdinand Servatius Michael Maria Freiherr von und zu Brenken, Graf Droste zu Vischering (1971- )
