= Apostolic Vicariate of Anhalt =

The Apostolic Vicariate of Anhalt was a Roman Catholic Latin missionary circonscription in northern Germany, with see in Anhalt.

== History ==
It was established in 1836 as an apostolic vicariate (exempt, i.e. directly subject to the Holy See, not part of any ecclesiastical province; entitled to a titular bishop) on territory split off from the Apostolic Vicariate of the Nordic Missions.

It was suppressed on 1 March 1921, when its territory passed to the Roman Catholic Diocese of Paderborn, whose Bishop (later Archbishop, as his see was promoted Archdiocese) had been appointed Anhalt's last Apostolic Vicar on 19 June 1920.

== Episcopal ordinaries ==
(incomplete) ...

- Kaspar Klein (1920.06.19 – 1921.03.01), already Bishop of Paderborn (later Archbishop)

== See also ==
- Roman Catholicism in Germany

== Source and External links ==
- GigaCatholic with incumbent biography links
