= Lambert Closse =

Canadian politician

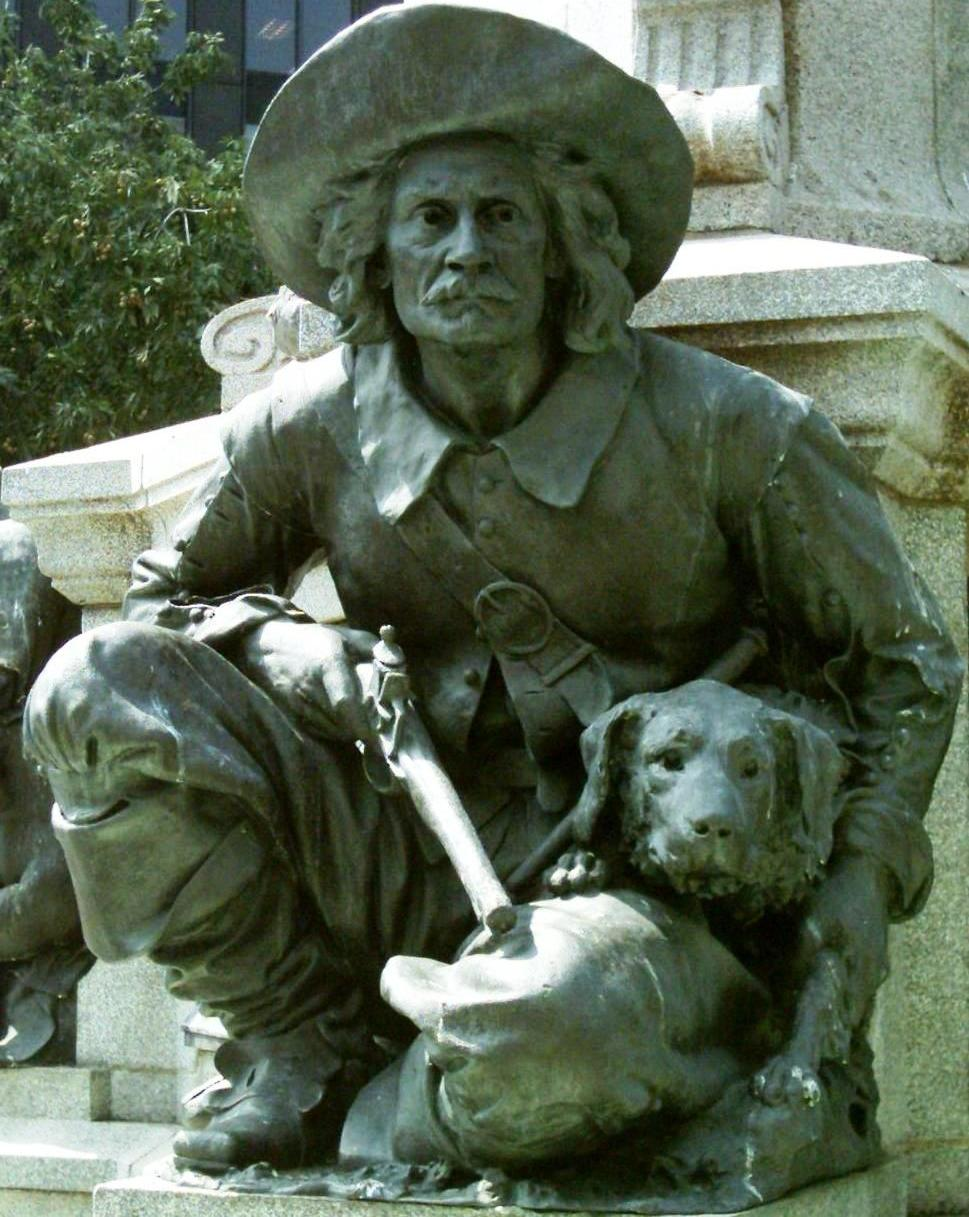
- Lambert Closse statue, Maisonneuve Monument
- Born: 1578; Mogues, France
- Died: February 6, 1662
- Cause of death: fighting the Iroquois

Raphaël Lambert Closse (1618–1662) was a merchant when he disembarked at Ville-Marie, Nouvelle-France in 1647.

His exact date of birth is unknown, however, he was born in Mogues in the Ardennes department of today's northern France.

He became a public notary, as well as Sergeant Major of the garrison of Ville-Marie. He is most known for his work in fighting the Iroquois and exhibiting combat tactics that allowed him to win many fights during his time. He met his wife, Elisabeth Moyen, while rescuing her from the Iroquois in 1657.

Lambert Closse died in combat fighting the Iroquois in 1662.

== Legacy ==
The Lambert Closse rose, developed by Agriculture and Agri-Food Canada, was named in his honour.
