= Johannes Olav Fallize =

Belgian-born Norwegian Roman Catholic bishop

- Vicar Apostolic of Norway and Spitsbergen
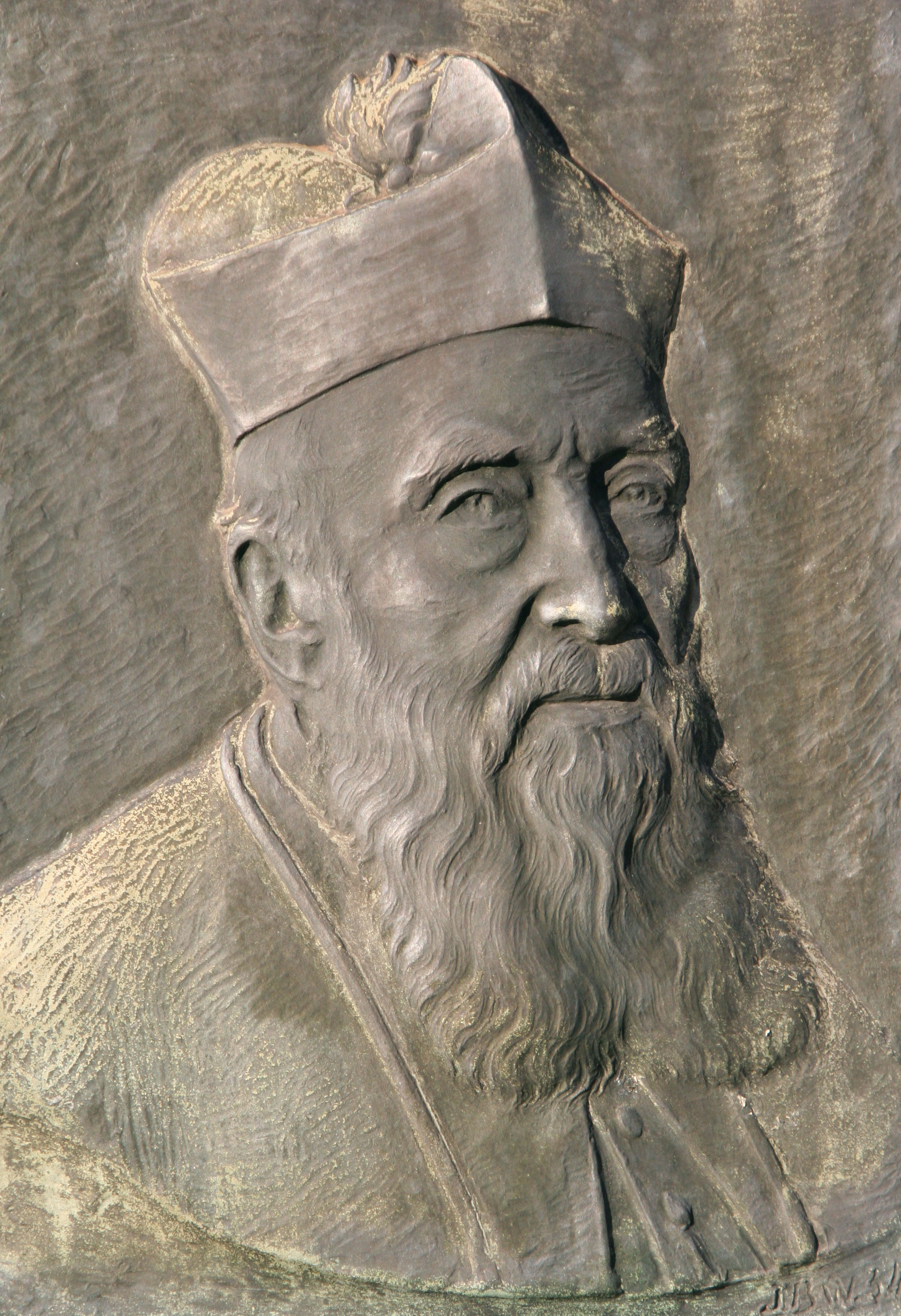
- Native name: Jean-Baptiste Fallize
- Church: Catholic Church
- See: Apostolic Vicariate of Norway and Spitsbergen
- In office: 18 May 1877 – 21 June 1922
- Predecessor: Bernard Bernard
- Successor: Johannes Olav Smit
- Other post: Titular Archbishop of Chalcis in Graecia (1922-1933)
- Previous post: Titular Bishop of Elusa (1892-1922)

Orders
- Ordination: 8 April 1871
- Consecration: 19 March 1892 by Paul Melchers

Personal details
- Born: 9 November 1844 Bettelange (near Harlange), Luxembourg, Kingdom of the Netherlands
- Died: 23 October 1933 (aged 88) Luxembourg City, Luxembourg

Johannes Olav Fallize, Ph.D., D.Th. (9 November 1844, Bettelange, Luxembourg, Belgium – 23 October 1933, Luxembourg, Luxembourg), was the first Roman Catholic bishop in Norway since the Reformation. As the head of the Catholic Church of Norway for 35 years, he was the Prefect Apostolic of Norway from 1887 to 1892 and the Vicar Apostolic of Norway from 1892 to 1922.

Throughout his career, he promoted antisemitic ideas, both during his early career as a journalist and later as bishop.

== Background ==
Jean-Baptiste Fallize was actually born in Belgium to Luxembourger parents on 9 November 1844. In his autobiography, he wrote that his birth and baptism were both recorded in Belgium in Villers-la-Bonne-Eau, (since 1977, a neighborhood of the city of Bastogne) in the province of Luxembourg but his birth certificate showed that he was actually born in the nearby village of Bettelange (German: Bettlingen, Luxembourgish: Bëtleng), where his father had been working for a tannery. But his parents, Jean Fallize and Thérèse Pfeffer, were Luxembourgers from Arsdorf (Luxembourgish: Uerschdref, now a part of the Municipality of Rambrouch), in the canton of Redange. In 1850, when Jean-Baptiste was six years old, they moved with their children across the border to Harlange (German: Harlingen, Luxembourgish: Harel, now in the municipality of Lac de la Haute-Sûre), in the canton of Wiltz, in the Grand Duchy of Luxembourg. In Harlange, Jean opened his own tanner's workshop and the children would spend the rest of their childhood in Harlange. One of them was Philippe-Michel Fallize, C.S.C. (1855–1920), a priest and missionary who served the Diocese of Dacca (now Dhaka, Bangladesh) as its Vicar General for 21 years (1889–1910).

Jean-Baptiste's parents sent him to the Athénée de Luxembourg, the Grand Duchy's seminary for the priestly candidates in Luxembourg. After graduating in 1866, he accepted the request of Nicolas Adames, the first Bishop of Luxembourg, and went to Rome to study philosophy, theology and other subjects at the Collegium Germanicum et Hungaricum, the German-speaking seminary, and at the Pontifical Gregorian University, the Jesuit school. He was ordained as a priest at the Archbasilica of St. John Lateran in Rome in 1871 and, in the following year, he earned his doctorates in philosophy and theology.

When Fallize returned to Luxembourg in July 1872, he was appointed as the Associate Dean and Director of the new diocesan boarding school for boys. In 1876, he was appointed as the priest of the parish of Pintsch (Luxembourgish: Pënsch) in the canton of Wiltz in northern Luxembourg.

== The Priest, The Journalist, The Politician ==
From the beginning, Fallize was politically active. He began as a journalist. He founded and edited two weekly newspapers, the Luxemburger Sonntags-blättchen für Stadt und Land [Luxembourger Sunday Digest for the City and State] (1874–1887) (renamed two years later as the Luxemburger Sonntagsblatt für Erbauung, Unterhaltung und Belehrung [Luxembourger Sunday Journal for Edification, Entertainment and Education]), for the Catholic readers, and the Luxemburger Volksblatt [Luxembourger People's Journal] (1880–1885) for the political readers. To them he added the Luxemburger Marienkalendar [St. Mary's Calendar] in 1877. He had already written for another calendar before – the Luxemburger Hauskalendar [House Calendar] in 1874. For his new calendar, he would write for the next ten years, until 1887. Within a few years, he had the control of most of the Catholic press and publishing operations of the Grand Duchy. Always a conservative and an ultramontanist, he criticized Freemasons, the liberals, the Kulturkampf, anything that threatened the Catholic Church. Some of his editorials annoyed the Prime Minister, Félix Baron de Blochausen, a Liberal, so much that the priest got thirty days in jail in 1880. But he also won on 14 June 1881 a seat with the Chamber of Deputies of the Grand Duchy to represent the canton of Clervaux (German: Clerf, Luxembourgish: Klief) in northern Luxembourg. However, to claim his seat, he had to be given the honorable discharge on 21 September 1881 from his parish because his new career was not compatible with his old career. He moved to the capital, Luxembourg City, where he supported the Catholic Right party for six years, from 1881 to 1888.

Because of his activities, Fallize was appointed in 1884 by the new Bishop of Luxembourg, Johannes Joseph Koppes, as the economus (responsible for the finances and logistics) and general vicar of the Diocese of Luxembourg. In the following year, he also founded the Sankt-Paulus Publications (now Saint-Paul Luxembourg) to publish magazines and pamphlets in the support of the Catholic Church. He also became the editor of a national daily, the Luxemburger Wort, and he served in this position for two years, until 1887.

On 6 February 1887, because of his successes in both media and politics, Fallize was named by Pope Leo XIII as the second Prefect Apostolic of Norway as well as the Protonotary Apostolic and the Prelate of the Papal Chambers.

== The Bishop of Norway ==
Fallize arrived in Christiania (now Oslo) three months later, on 18 May 1887, to begin his term. As the saying goes, he went from a big fish in a small pond to a small fish in a big pond. It had been 350 years since the Reformation chased the Catholic bishops and priests out of Norway but the priests had already been ministering in Christiania since 1843 and Bergen since 1854. They were joined in 1869 by the first Prefect Apostolic, Bernard Bernard, a Frenchman. When Fallize succeeded him, there were only 800 believers and 16 priests in just four parishes and most of them were foreigners in the cities.

With characteristic energy and efficiency, Fallize, assisted by a group of priests imported from Luxembourg, set out to organize a Catholic community throughout Norway. He founded parishes, schools, hospitals and associations and built eight new churches. He introduced Roman Liturgy and Gregorian chants. He travelled extensively throughout his vast diocese, from Kristiansand to Svalbard, and, in his visits to other countries, he raised funds for his diocese. In 1889, his second year in Christiania, he founded the weekly Catholic magazine, St. Olaf Katholsk tidende [St. Olav Catholic Magazine], and the St. Olafs Trykkeri [St. Olaf Publications] and, four years later, he had more than 50 titles published in Norwegian. In 1901, he created the Franciscan Sisters [Franciskussøstre], a congregation of nuns named in honor of St. Francis Xavier, to look after his hospitals and schools. He was so active that, whenever the Lutherans of Norway thought of the Catholic Church at all, they saw two faces – Fallize and the Pope.

Although he was Luxembourger, Fallize was loyal to his adopted country. He placed a great importance on Norwegian patriotism and praised the Norwegian ways of democracy and tolerance. He wrote books and articles about Norway for his readers in Luxembourg, France, Belgium, Germany, Austria and Switzerland. To his former newspapers, the Luxembourg Wort, he sent 24 letters about Norway between 1887 and 1898. In 1913, he ensured that the Vatican would be the first to recognize the Norwegian sovereignty over Svalbard and added the archipelago's German name, "Spitsbergen", to his episcopal titles. He was even naturalized as a citizen of Norway on 22 April 1891 – with a new and properly Norwegian name – Johannes Olav Fallize, in the honor of his adopted country's patron saint, St. Olav. Six years later, in 1897, for the first time since the Reformation, the feast of St. Olav was celebrated in Trondheim.

But Fallize was not without faults. He was strong, sharp and intelligent, a good businessman and administrator, but, as he often proclaimed from the pulpit, "I cannot tolerate contradictions!" [Jeg tåler ikke motsigelser!]" He was a shepherd of the old school, who demanded total obedience in the name of the Church, so he got into conflict with just about everyone – the people, the sisters, the civil authorities and even the Vatican. He would give his priests detailed instructions on everything, including clothes, sports (he did not want them in sports) and bicycles. He told the Catholic parents to send their children to Catholic schools only under the threat of excommunication, even as the Vatican pleaded him to keep a softer line.

But Fallize also had failures. The Constitution of 1814 had enshrined the ban against "the Jesuit and other monastic orders" (see Jesuit clause) for all of Norway. In 1894, Fallize tried to persuade the Storting (Parliament) of Norway to lift the ban against the Jesuits by writing and publishing a pamphlet, Munken og Jesuiterne: Apologetisk Afhandling [Monks and Jesuits : Apologetic Essay], in which he debunked the myths about the Jesuits and explained the misunderstandings about their doctrines and practices. The Storting refused – for the next three years. In 1897, "other monastic orders" were allowed to enter Norway but the Jesuits had to wait until 1956.

Nevertheless, Fallize was so successful in his endeavors that, on 11 March 1892, Pope Leo XIII was able to upgrade the status of Norway to "Apostolic Vicariate", promoting Fallize to the rank of Vicar Apostolic. Although he was still the head of the Catholic Church of Norway, the new title did not have the gravity and authority of a regular bishop so, on 19 March 1892, he was consecrated as the Titular Bishop of Elusa. The ceremony was performed in Rome by Paul Ludolf Cardinal Melchers, the former Archbishop of Cologne, with the assistance of Archbishop Tancredo Fausti and Bishop Victor-Jean-Joseph-Marie van der Branden de Reeth. So Fallize was effectively the first Catholic bishop ever to govern Norway since the Reformation.

On 18 May 1912, Fallize was awarded the Commander of the Order of St. Olav for his philanthropic activities and his writings about Norway. 23 days later, on 31 May, Pope Pius X made him an Assistant to the Throne of St. Peter and a Papal Count of Rome for his missionary efforts and achievements in growing the Catholic Church in Norway.

== Retirement ==
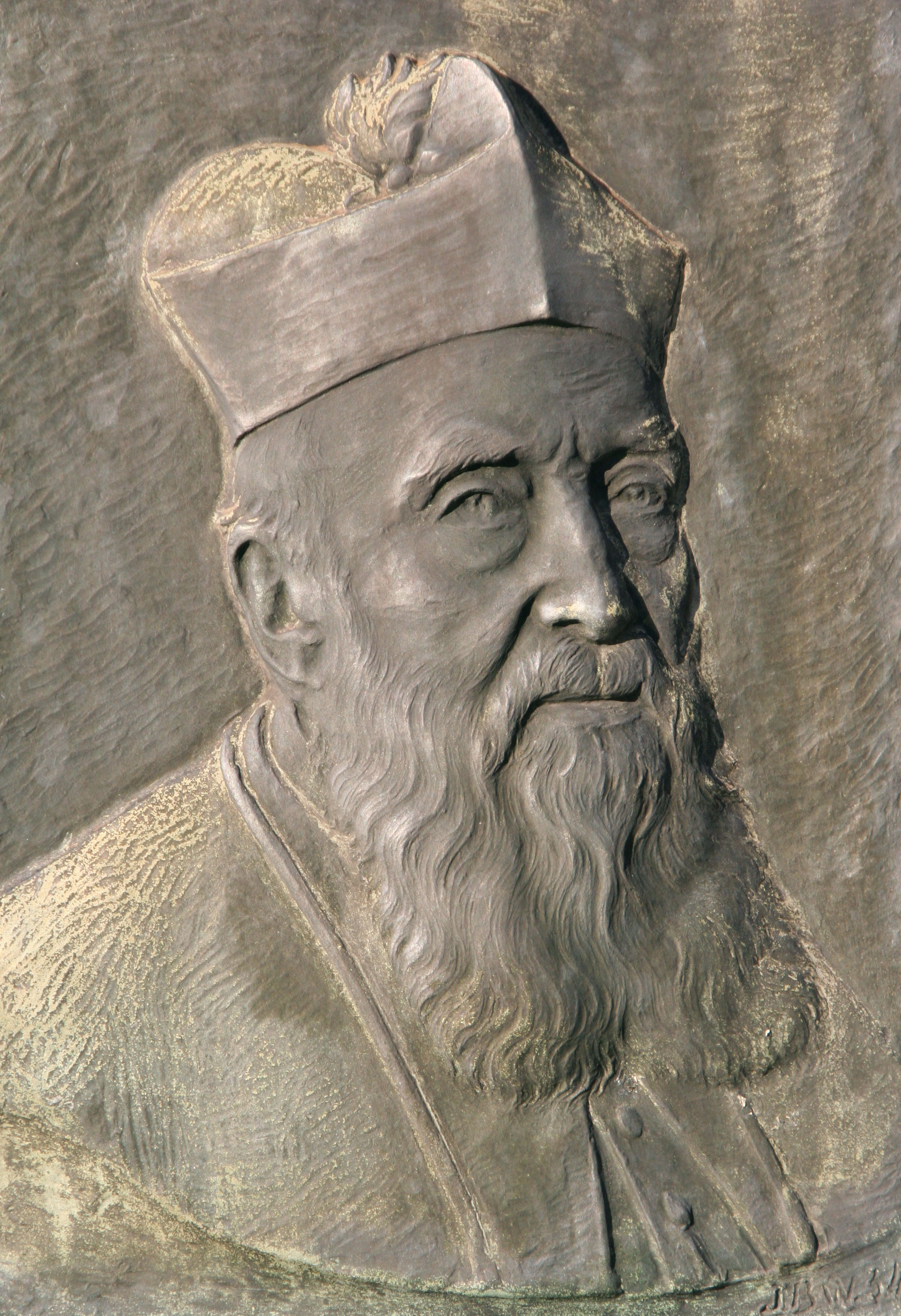
Portrait from the Archbishop's tombstone at St. Nicholas Cemetery in Luxembourg City, Luxembourg.

On 21 June 1922, Fallize was allowed to resign from all his duties in Norway. Old age and illness were given as the official reasons but one of the biographers believed that his resignation was made at the request of the Vatican, which had found him "a little too willful" and difficult. However, he had made the Catholic Church bigger, better and stronger in Norway, with about 2,600 believers (in 1920) in ten parishes, so, for that, he was made the Titular Archbishop of Chalcis in Graecia on 9 October 1922. He stayed in Bergen for the next two years but, on 25 April 1924, he moved back to Luxembourg, where he retired to the convent of St. Zita in Luxembourg City. He died there on 23 October 1933 at the age of 89. With a funeral at the Cathedral of Our Lady in Luxembourg City, he was buried at St. Nicholas Cemetery (French: Cimetière Notre-Dame, German: Liebfrauenfriedhof) in the Limpertsberg district in the same city on 31 October 1933.

== Works ==
Fluent in five languages – German, French, Norwegian, Latin and Dutch, Fallize was more than just an editor and publisher of newspapers and a copywriter for calendars. He also penned poems, editorials, lectures, reports, memoirs, travelogues but his subjects were not limited to the Catholic Church, Norway and Luxembourg.

Between 1864 and 1869, when he was still a student at the Athénée, Jean-Baptiste created about a hundred poems, in all styles ranging from ghazals to sestinas, about certain aspects of his homeland – the Moselle River, Vianden, emigration to America (his brother Philippe-Michel had gone to America), and others, including the Blessed Virgin Mary.

But, after 1870, he switched to travelogues. He wrote about his university years in Rome in Eine Reise nach Rom [A Journey to Rome], published in the first volume of the Luxemburger Volksbibliothek [Luxembourger People's Library], a series of Christian literature he had founded to be read daily at home.

When he was in Norway, Johannes Olav wrote long travel stories, which were translated into German, Norwegian and Portuguese, and descriptions of wildlife, cities, villages and landscapes. He published four books about his trips in the Land of the Midnight Sun, three in French – Tournée pastorales en Norvège [Pastoral Tour of Norway] in 1895, Promenades en Norvège in 1900 and Excursions en Norvège et chez les Lapons [Excursions in Norway and with the Lapps] in 1912 – and one in Dutch, Verkenningstochten in Norwegen [Expeditions in Norway] in 1904. He also edited Papal letters and directives in a book, Kirkelige Bekjendtgjørelser [Ecclesiastical Announcements], as well as works of edification and school textbooks. He also contributed to magazines such as Katholische Missionen in Freiburg im Breisgau, Les missions catholiques in Lyon and St. Olav Katholsk tidende in Christiania. Altogether, his publications totaled more than 50 titles. One of them is Der kleine Jesus als Applicant, a jubilee pamphlet published in Norwegian in 1895 and German in 1898 to encourage the Catholic youth to become priests, monks and nuns.

== Legacy ==
There is a monument honoring Fallize, with an accompanying chapel, on the spot of the former tannery, where his father once worked, in the valley of the Bëtlerbaach (German: Bettlingenbach), on the Belgian border.

== Bibliography ==
- (in German) Father Martin Blum, "Litterarische Arbeiten von Johann Baptiste Fallize [ Literary Works of Johann Baptiste Fallize ]", Om Hémecht : Organ des Veriines für Luxemburger Geschichte, Litteratur und Kunft [ Our Homeland : Organ of the Association of Luxembourger History, Literature and Culture ], Volume 4, No. 6 (1 June 1898), pages 329–331; Volume 4, No 8 (1 August 1898), pages 395–400.
- (in German) Father Martin Blum, "27. Johann Baptist Fallize", Om Hémecht : Organ des Veriines für Luxemburger Geschichte, Litteratur und Kunft, Volume 4, No. 5 (1 May 1898), pages 285–400.
- (in German) Franz Baeumker, Johannes Olav Fallize : ein bischöflicher pionier des Skandinavischen nordens [ Johannes Olav Fallize : an Episcopal Pioneer of the Scandinavian North ] ( Aachen : Xavierus Verlagsbuchhandlung [ Xavierus Printing Press and Store ], 1924)
- (in French and German) Claude D. Conter, "Fallize, Jean-Baptiste Olaf", Dictionnaire des Auteurs Luxembourgeois [ Dictionary of Luxembourger Authors ], retrieved 10 January 2014, also available in the (in German) version.
- (in German) Anton Guill, Johannes Olav Fallize, ehemaliger Apostolischer Vikar von Norwegen und Spitzbergen, Titularerzbischof von Chalcis [ Johannes Olav Fallize, former Apostolic Vicar of Norway and Spitzbergen, Titular Archbishop of Chalcis ] ( Fribourg, Switzerland : Schweiz Kanisiuswerk, Päpstl. Druckerei und Buchhandlung [ Canisius Works of Switzerland, Papal Printing Press and Store ], 1929)
- (in German) André Heiderscheid, "Ehre, wem Ehre gebührt! [ Honor to Whom Honor is Due! ]"; in: Luxemburger Marienkalender 1998, page 1
- Ed[ouard Marc] Kayser, "Jean-Baptiste (Olav) Fallize 1844–1933"; In : 400 Joer Kolléisch, Band II [ 400 Years of the College, Volume 2 ] (Luxembourg City : Sankt-Paulus-Verlag, 2003), ISBN 2-87963-419-9, pages 301-303
- (in German) E. M., Von der Gerberei am Bettlingerbach bis zum Nordkap – Erzbischof Johann Olav Fallize (1844–1933) [ From the Tannery in the Bettlingerbach to the North Cape – Archbishop Johann Olav Fallize (1844–1933); in : Luxemburger Wort, Saturday, 22 October 1983, page 7
- (in Norwegian) Lars Roar Langslet, "Johannes Olaf Fallize", Norsk Biografisk Leksikon [ Norwegian Biographical Dictionary ], retrieved 10 January 2014.
- (in German) Father Jean[-Nicolas] Malget, "Johann Olav Fallize, Apostolischer Vikar von Norwegen und Spitzbergen [ Johann Olav Fallize, Apostolic Vicar of Norway and Spitzbergen ]"; in: Hémecht, Volume 35 (1983), No. 4, pages 613-634; Volume 36 (1984), No. 1, pages 51–78; No. 3, pages 415–456.
- "Personnagen [ Personages ] : Johannes Olav Fallize". In: Lëtzebuerger Journal, Sunday – Saturday, 9 – 10. November 1996, page 8.
- (in German) Edouard Molitor, Monseigneur Dr. Johann Olav Fallize : win Kämpfer für das Reich Christi [ Monseigneur Dr. Johannes Olav Fallize : a Struggle for the Kingdom of the Christ ] (Luxembourg City : Sankt-Paulus-Druckerei, 1969)
