= Bernard Bernard =

French Catholic priest (1821–1895)

Father Bernard Bernard
- Prefect Apostolic of Norway
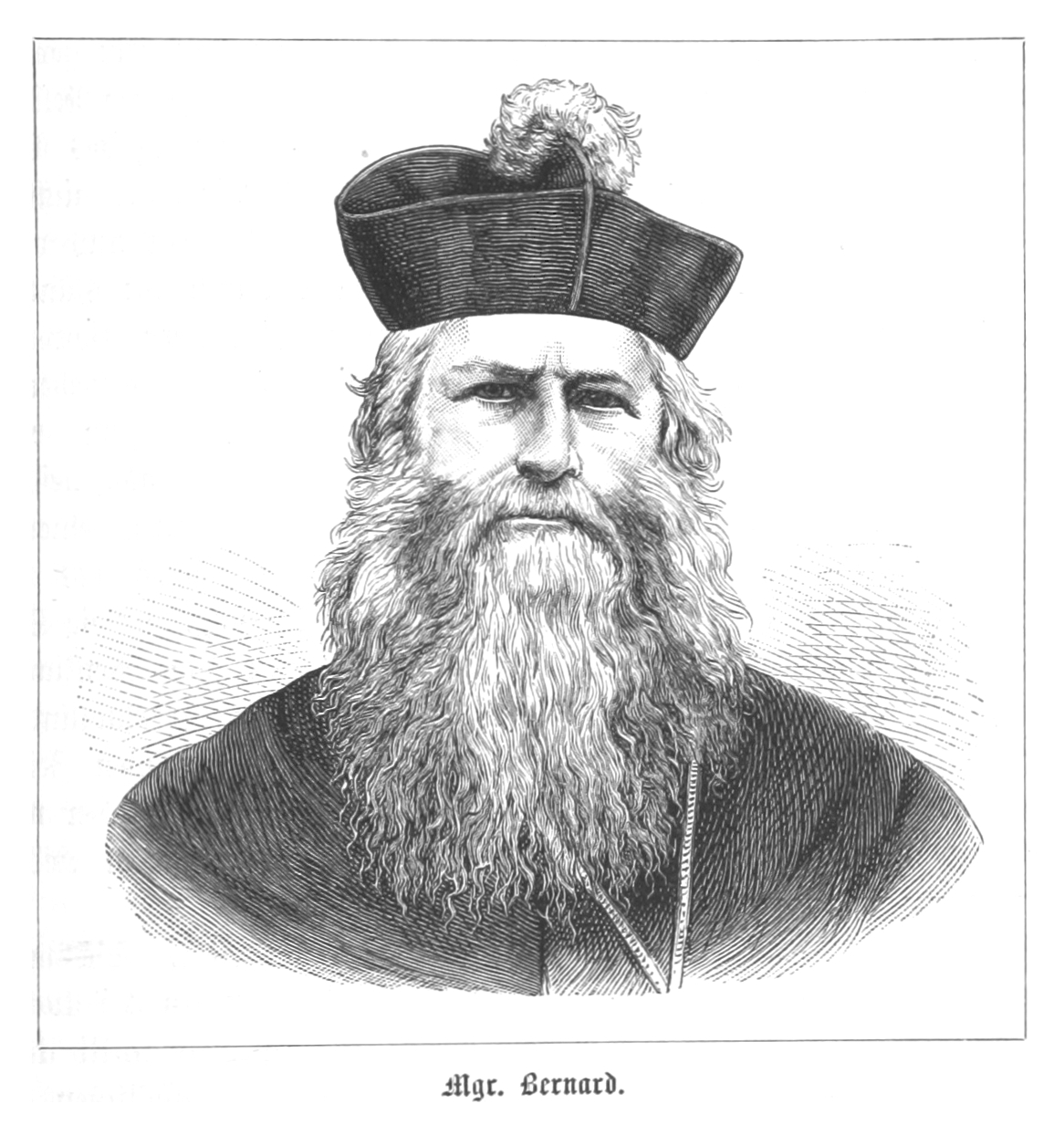
- Bernard Bernard in Iceland
- Appointed: 1869
- Term ended: 1887

Orders
- Ordination: 5 Jul 1846 by Thomas-Marie-Joseph Gousset

Personal details
- Born: 21 July 1821; Mogues, France
- Died: 28 October 1895 (aged 74)

Bernard Bernard (21 July 1821 in Mogues, France – 28 October 1895) was a French Catholic priest and missionary in Norway, Iceland and Scotland. He was the first Prefect Apostolic of Norway and Lapland from 1869 to 1887.

== Life ==
Bernard was educated as a priest in Rome and received his ordination in Reims by Cardinal Thomas-Marie-Joseph Gousset (1792–1866). First a parish priest in the French Ardennes for a couple of years, he arrived in Norway in 1856, where he was put into service in the Catholic North Pole Mission (Praefectura Apostolica Poli Arctici). Later in 1856 he was sent to Iceland, which was a part of the North Pole Mission, where he arrived in 1857. Together with Jean-Baptiste Baudoin (1831–1875), Bernard was the first Catholic priest to serve in Iceland after the Reformation, where they built a small chapel at the Landakot farmstead near Reykjavík. They met with a difficult reception and in 1862 Bernard left the country upon his appointment to head the Roman Catholic Apostolic Prefecture of the North Pole, while Baudoin persevered until 1875.

On April 5, 1869, Bernard was appointed Prefect Apostolic of Norway and Lapland with residence in Trondheim. For reasons of health, Bernard resigned as Prefect Apostolic in 1887 and left Norway. He was followed by the Luxembourg priest Johannes Olav Fallize (1844–1933), from 1892 Titular Bishop of Elusa, under whom the mission steadily developed, although not yet large.

== Secondary literature on Bernard ==
- Gunnar F. Guðmundsson, Kaþólskt trúboð á Íslandi 1857-1875, Reykjavík: Sagnfræðistofnun Háskóla Íslands 1987.
- St. Ansgar. Jahrbuch des St.-Ansgarius Werkes, Cologne 1983, pp 70–81.

== See also ==
- Religion in Iceland#Catholic revival
- Landakotskirkja
- Magnús Eiríksson
