= Jean-Baptiste Baudoin =

Jean-Baptiste Baudoin (11 January 1831 in Juniville, France – 15 November 1875 in Juniville) was a French Catholic priest and missionary in Iceland.

== Life ==
Baudoin and Bernard Bernard (1821–1895) were the first Catholic priests serve in Iceland after the Reformation. They arrived in 1857 (Bernard) and 1858 (Baudoin) respectively, and built a small chapel at the Landakot farmstead near Reykjavík. They met with a difficult reception and in 1862 Bernard left the country, while Baudoin persevered until 1875.

Baudoin was occupied with polemics all the time he lived in Iceland (1858–1875). He wrote many articles in newspapers in order to answer criticism against the Catholic Church. In addition to that he wrote several books in Icelandic (see the bibliography below), e.g. a booklet with the title Jesús Kristr er guð þrátt fyrir mótmæli Magnúsar Eiríkssonar (1867) [Jesus Christ is God in spite of the protest of Magnús Eiríksson], which was aimed at the book by the Icelandic Theologian Magnús Eiríksson, entitled Er Johannes-Evangeliet et apostolisk og ægte Evangelium [Is the Gospel of John an apostolic and true Gospel] (1863).

== Main works ==
- Útskýring um trú katólsku kirkjunnar í þeim trúaratriðum, þar sem ágreiningr er milli hennar og mótmælenda, Reykjavík 1865.
- [Anonymous], Svar hinna katólsku presta upp á 1. bréfið frá París eptir Eirík Magnússon. Hvað segir sagan um Parísarbréfið?, Reykjavík 1866.
- Jesús Kristr er guð. Þrátt fyrir mótmæli herra Magnúsar Eiríkssonar, Reykjavík 1867.
- [Anonymous], Er það satt eðr ósatt, sem hra Jónas Guðmundsson segir um bækling vorn: "Jesús Kristr er Guð" o. s. frv.?, Reykjavík 1867.
- Til Íslendinga : um Lestrarbók handa alþýðu, eftir séra Þórarinn Böðvarsson. Reykjavík 1875.

== Secondary literature on Baudoin ==
- Gunnar F. Guðmundsson, Kaþólskt trúboð á Íslandi 1857-1875, Reykjavík: Sagnfræðistofnun Háskóla Íslands 1987.
- St. Ansgar. Jahrbuch des St.-Ansgarius Werkes, Cologne 1983, pp 70–81.

== See also ==
- Religion in Iceland § Catholic revival
- Landakotskirkja
- Magnús Eiríksson
