= Jens Andersen Beldenak =

Danish bishop (1450–1537)

Jens Andersen Beldenak (died 1537), called the Bald, was a Danish bishop. He was born in the village of Brøndum, the Limfjord, and died 20 January 1537. Historians generally considered him a controversial figure due to his being a contrarian in addition to a quarrelsome character. Aside from his position in the church, he was an important figure in the court of King Christian II due to his legal expertise. Particularly, Beldenak was credited for transforming Sweden from electoral to a hereditary kingdom.

== Background ==
Jens Andersen Beldenak was the son of a poor shoemaker. He was only taught in a convent school but he later studied in Cologne and Rome, where he also worked in the papal office. When he returned to Denmark, he was employed at the King John's office and soon distinguished himself for his sharp intellect, his eloquence and his legal knowledge and in 1501 became bishop of the Diocese of Funen, where he soon fell into a long-standing conflict with the nobility. Beldenak was the only bishop in Denmark who did not belong to the nobility.

King Christian II hired him often on diplomatic missions and in 1503 he was the envoy to the peace meeting in Lübeck, where he exceeded his instructions by promising compensation to Lübeck for mobilizing ships during the war. Partly because of this action the king accused him in 1517, who demanded a large indemnity, and he was followed several years in prison. He however managed to regain the king's confidence and traveled to Sweden 1520-1521. He could, through their legal knowledge, the single Privy Council in the Grey Friar's Abbey in Stockholm, to recognize the King Christian's succession to the crown of Sweden. During this period, he instructed the council lords regarding the provisions of the Swedish law for royal elections. The existing rule - based on St. Erik's law - mandated that the king should be elected by the council in case the dead king had several sons. Beldenak's claim was that King Christian II was the rightful heir because he was elected during his father's reign.

Beldenak's role in the king's accession gained him favor and position in the royal court. He took part, for instance, in the sentencing of Sten Sture the Younger and other individuals accused of heresy. As a reward for his service, he received episcopal chair to the murdered Bishop Mattias in Strangnas. He became a member of the government after King Christian's departure and helped steer Swedish policy thereafter. He was also involved in combating of Gustav Vasa, leading the liberation struggle. He participated in the Battle of Brunnbäck Ferry (April 1521). Then he pulled even with Didrik Slagheck, he returned to Denmark and was imprisoned there at Hammershus on Bornholm. He regained his diocese in 1523 by virtue of King Frederick's order but still had a strained relationship to the nobility until 1529 when he withdrew his diocese to Knut Gyldenstierne against an annual maintenance and yard Kjærstrup on Taasinge.

After some indiscreet comments about the king, he was sentenced in 1530 to honor loss. In 1533 he was transferred to Kjærstrup by Daniel Rantzau, was abducted and beaten to Holstein. After six months in captivity, he was bought free of any relatives in Lübeck, where he spent his last days. Jens Andersen Beldenak are depicted in the altarpiece of the church Faaborg.
