= Academic Boniface Association =

The Academic Boniface Association (German: Akademische Bonifatius-Verein) was a German Catholic youth organization for students at colleges and universities.

== History ==
The Association originates from the unification of a number of smaller associations founded throughout Germany since 1865; the first of these was founded on 30 July 1867 in Münster, followed in December 1867 by Breslau and Paderborn These organizations' primary goal was to collect money and gather support for the German diaspora, the situation in which many German Catholics lived in predominantly Protestant areas and lacked appropriate financial, logistical, and organizational means for the proper execution of their faith. In 1871, they were able to build the first of a number of churches, a St. Pius church in Greifswald, Mecklenburg-Vorpommern. A second objective was the education of Catholic students, for which purpose lectures and meetings were held.

The different organizations unified in 1885 to form the Akademische Bonifatius-Verein. In 1914, the national organization counted 52 local chapters, a number which dwindled during World War I to 40; there were chapters in Austria, Switzerland, and Luxembourg as well. Just before World War I, 30% of all Catholic students were members of the organization; 90% of its regular members were in the armed forces during the war.

== Akademische Bonifatius-Korrespondenz ==
Around 1885 the Akademische Bonifatius-Korrespondenz was founded, the journal for the national organization. Initially the journal's function was to report organizational news to members, but in 1907, under the editorship of Johannes Mumbauer, it was recast as a cultural Catholic magazine. Its circulation on the eve of World War I was 13,000, large enough to consider it one of the major Catholic academic publications of its time. The magazine was considered "independent from Rome."

== Bibliography ==
- Fuchs, Stephen (2004). "Vom Segen des Krieges". Franz Steiner Verlag. ISBN 978-3-515-08316-4.
- Huber, Kurt Augustinus; Joachim Bahlke (2005). Katholische Kirche und Kultur in Böhmen. LIT Verlag Münster. ISBN 978-3-8258-6687-7.
