= Apostolic Prefecture of the North Pole =

Former Apostolic Prefecture of the Roman Catholic Church (1855-1869)

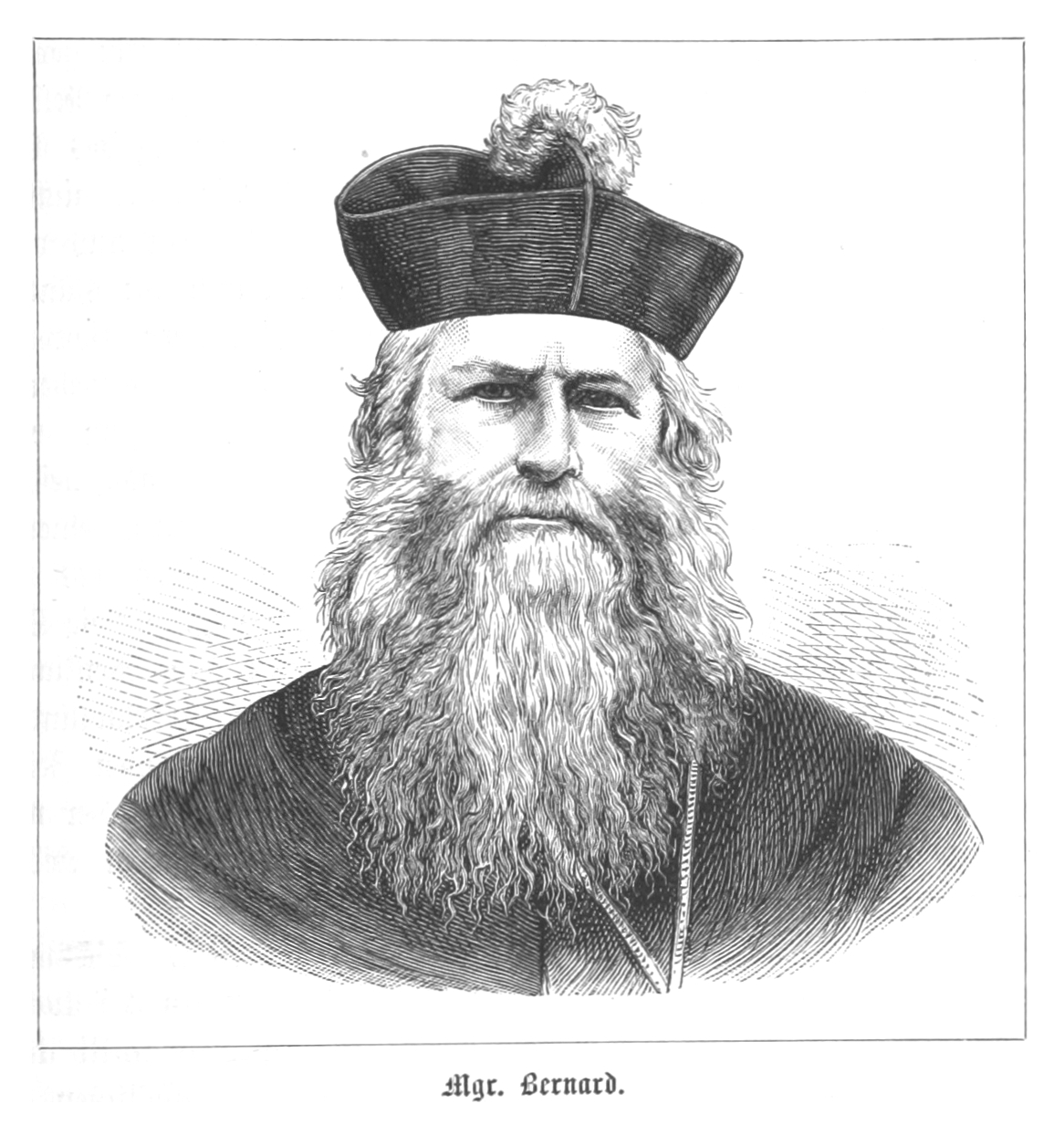
Bernard Bernard, the last bishop of the prefecture

The Roman Catholic Apostolic Prefecture of the North Pole (Latin: Praefectura Apostolica Poli Arctici) existed from 1855 to 1869.

== History ==
The Apostolic Prefecture of the North Pole was established by the Sacred Congregation for the Propagation of the Faith through a decree of 8 December 1855, consisting of territory in Arctic Canada (including Rupert's Land, the Northwest Territories and British Arctic Territories), the portions of Sweden and Norway north of the Arctic Circle, Greenland, Iceland and the Faroe Islands. The first see city was Alta, Norway. In 1860, Caithness and the Shetland and Orkney Islands were added to the prefecture. Church missions were located in Alta, Tromsø and Hammerfest in Norway, Reykjavík in Iceland, Lerwick in the Shetlands, Tórshavn in the Faroe Islands, and Wick in Scotland. Though the prefecture had a vast territory, it contained few Catholics, and indeed not that many people in general; at the time of its establishment, Greenland and the British Arctic had yet to be visited by Catholic priests.

In March 1866, the prefecture gained all of Denmark, and was renamed to the Diocese of North Pole/Copenhagen. The seat was moved to Copenhagen. In 1868, territory was taken away from the prefecture to establish the Norwegian mission sui iuris. One year later, the apostolic prefecture was suppressed and the Apostolic Prefectures of Norway and Denmark were established. Territory in Canada, Sweden and Scotland was returned to jurisdictions in those countries.

== Bishops ==
- 1855-1861: Etienne Djunkowsky
- 1862-1869: Bernard Bernard, subsequently Apostolic Prefect of Norway and Lapland
