= 1530s =

Decade

The 1530s decade ran from January 1, 1530, to December 31, 1539.

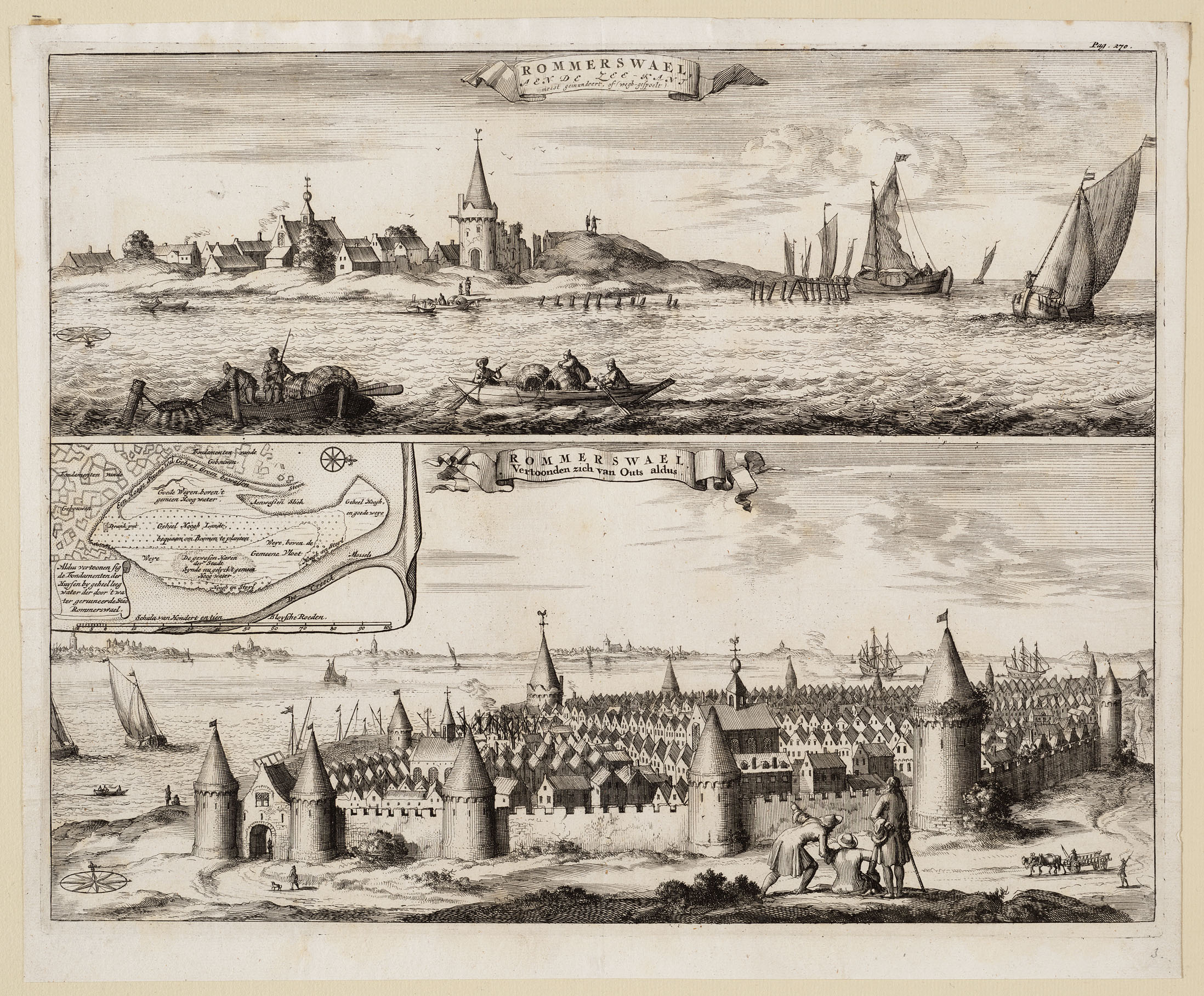
November 5, 1530: St. Felix's Flood destroys the city of Reimerswaal

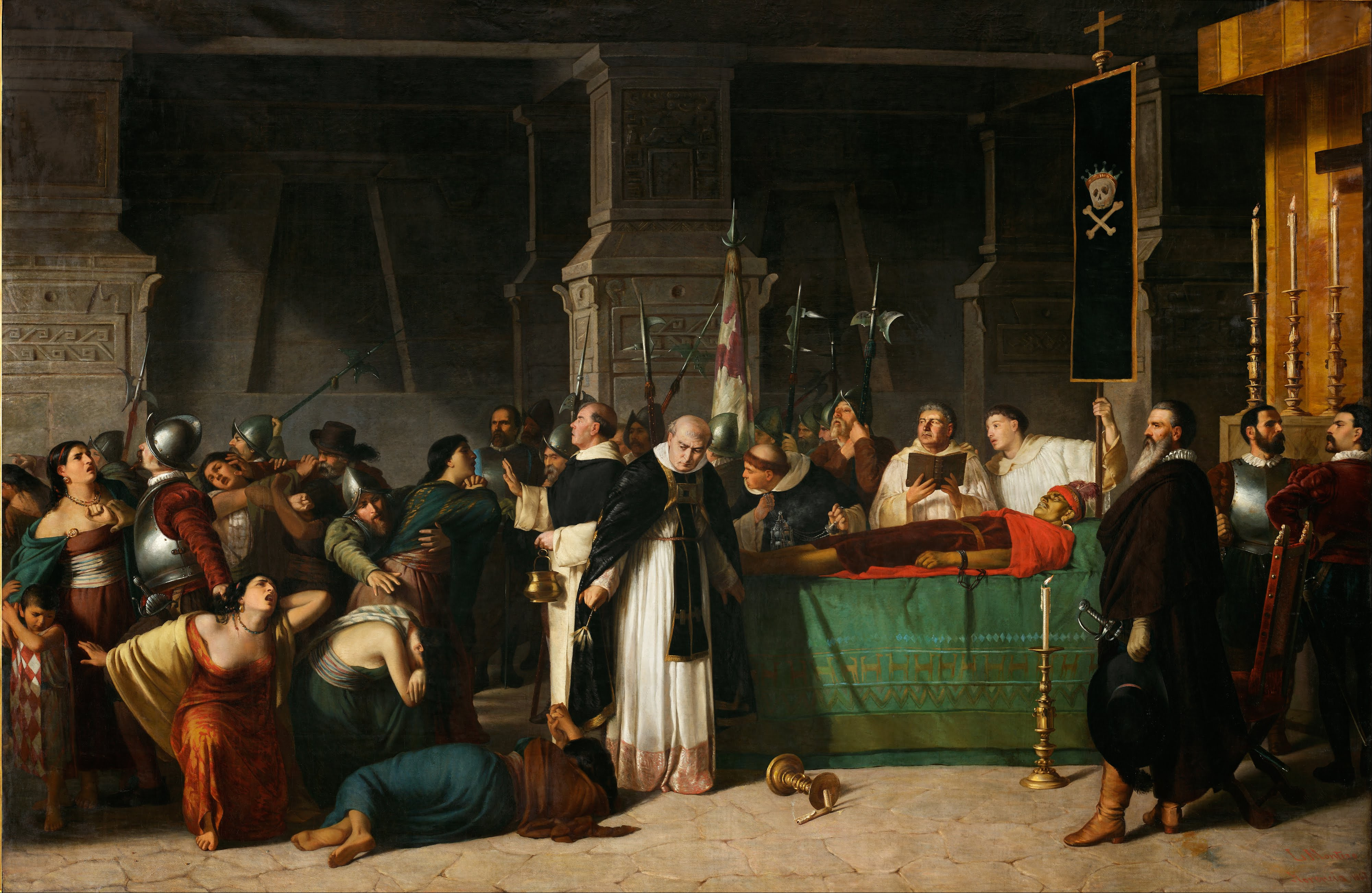
July 26, 1533: Execution of Atahualpa.

== Events ==
=== 1530 ===
==== January–March ====
- January 5 – Strasbourg joins the Christliches Burgrecht, the Protestant alliance of Swiss cities.
- January 20 – Sent on a mission to penetrate the interior of Mexico and to conquer the Kingdom of Michoacán, the Spanish conquistador Hernán Cortés leads a group of soldiers across the Lerma river through Cuitzeo and proceeds northwest. The arrive at Tonalá on March 24 and then take possession of the regions south of the Santiago River and north and west of Lake Chapala.
- January 21 – Charles V, Holy Roman Emperor, issues letters from his winter residence in Bologna, inviting members of the Imperial Diet to convene at Augsburg on April 8 to discuss various theological questions.
- February 14 – Tangaxuan II, last cazonci of the Purépecha Empire, is executed by conquistador Nuño de Guzmán, ending the Purépecha Empire's independence from Spain.
- February 24 – Charles V is crowned emperor in Bologna, by Pope Clement VII.
- March 23 – The Tribute of the Maltese Falcon, an agreement by the Grand Master of the Order of St John of Jerusalem to pay an annual tribute to the Charles V, King of Sicily, in return for an order granting the Knights full rulership of Tripoli and the islands of Malta and Gozo, is reached. The transfer of ownership takes place on October 26, 1550, although Tripoli is conquered by the Ottomans on August 15, 1551.

==== April–June ====
- April 8 – At the invitation of the Holy Roman Emperor, the members of the Imperial Diet open their session at Augsburg in Germany to prepare the Augsburg Confession, an official imperial set of rules for Protestantism.
- May 9 – The Kaqchikel people, a tribe of the Maya people of what is now the Sacatepéquez Department of Guatemala, surrender to the Spanish conquistadors.
- June 25 – The Augsburg Confession is presented to Charles V, Holy Roman Emperor.

==== July–September ====
- July 4 – King François of France marries Eleanor of Austria, daughter of King Philip I of Castile and widow of King Manuel I of Portugal.
- July 9 – The Tetrapolitan Confession, a Protestant confession of faith, is submitted jointly to Holy Roman Emperor Charles V on behalf of the southern German cities of Konstanz, Lindau, Memmingen and Strasbourg.
- July 19 – Turkish Ottoman troops attempt to take the Hungarian town of Nagykörű but, according to local legend, the Turkish soldirers are lost in a marsh protecting the city.
- July 25 – The transfer of Tripoli, in North Africa, from Spain to the Knights of Malta, is formally accomplished, four months after an agreement was reached with Charles V, Holy Roman Emperor, King of Spain and King of Sicily.
- July 30 – At Neue Augsburg (now Coro in the nation of Venezuela), German explorer Nikolaus Federmann becomes the acting governor of Klein-Venedig ("Little Venice") Germany's short-lived South American colonyas Governor Ambrosius Ehinger takes a leave of absence to recover from malaria.
- August 3 – Battle of Gavinana: Florence is captured by Spanish troops under Prince Philibert of Chalon (who is killed in the action). The Piagnon (followers of the memory of Girolamo Savonarola) are overthrown, ending the Siege of Florence, and the Medici are restored, in the person of the Pope's nephew Alessandro de' Medici.
- September 15 – The miraculous portrait of Saint Dominic in Soriano appears in Soriano Calabro, Calabria.

==== October–December ====
- October 8 – A flood engulfs Rome.
- October 26 – The Knights of Malta are formed, when the Knights Hospitaller are given Malta by Charles V. They transfer the island capital from Mdina to Birgu.
- November 5 – St. Felix's flood devastates Zeeland: a large part of the Verdronken Land van Reimerswaal is lost leading to decline of the city of Reimerswaal.
- November 24 – Tabinshwehti succeeds his father Mingyi Nyo as king of the Toungoo dynasty, following the latter's death.
- December 26 – Humayun starts to rule the Mughal Empire after Babur's death.
- December – Martim Afonso de Sousa's expedition sets out for Brazil from Portugal.

==== Date unknown ====
- The ducal palace of Celle is constructed in Germany.
- Austrian forces capture Esztergom, Hungary, and raid as far as Buda.
- Erasmus publishes On Civility in Children (De Civilitate Morum Puerilium Libellus), which becomes popular and widely translated.
- First complete edition of the 'Zürich Bible', Huldrych Zwingli's translation into German printed by Christoph Froschauer, is published.

=== 1531 ===
==== January–March ====
- January 15 – The third session of the Reformation Parliament of King Henry VIII of England is opened.
- January 26 – 1531 Lisbon earthquake: More than 30,000 people are killed in Portugal in an earthquake and subsequent tsunami.
- February 27 – Lutheran princes in the Holy Roman Empire form an alliance known as the Schmalkaldic League.
- February or March – Battle of Antukyah: Ahmad ibn Ibrahim al-Ghazi of the Adal Sultanate defeats the Ethiopian army.
- March 28 – In India, the fortress of Mandu, capital of the Malwa Sultanate, falls as Malwa's Sultan Mahmúd II and his sons surrender to Bahadur Shah of Gujarat.
- March 31 – King Henry VIII gives royal assent to numerous acts at the close of the session of the English Parliament, including the Poisoning Act 1530 (providing for boiling to death people convicted of poisioning other persons); the Vagabonds Act 1530 (permitting licensed begging by certified disabled and elderly people); the Egyptians Act 1530 to allow the expulsion of gypsies; and the Bridges Act 1530 for maintenance of bridges.

==== April–June ====
- April 12 – In the Songhai Empire that rules most of West Africa and the Niger River valley, the Emperor Askiya Musa is assassinated by his brothers after less than two years on the throne. Askia Mohammad Benkan is enthroned the same day.
- April 16 – The city of Puebla, Mexico, is founded.
- April – Battle of Puná: Francisco Pizarro defeats the native inhabitants of the island of Puná, off of the coast of what is now the South American nation of Ecuador.
- May 18 – The third Dalecarlian rebellion in Sweden is settled on St. Eric's Day at Arboga in Denmark when King Christian II returns church bells, confiscated earlier to pay Denmark's debts, to the villages in rebellion.
- May 27 – (11th waxing of Nayon 893 ME) Minkhaung of Mrauk-U, the Burmese King of Arakan since 1521, is killed in a coup d'etat by the rebellious Governor of Thandwe, Min Pa.
- June 24 – The city of San Juan del Río, Mexico, is founded.

==== July–September ====
- July 25 – The city of Santiago de Querétaro, Mexico is founded.
- August 22 – Battle of Obertyn: The Moldavians are defeated by Polish forces under Jan Tarnowski, allowing the Poles to recapture Pokucie.
- August 26 – Comet Halley achieves its perihelion.
- September 15 – The first Parliament of Ireland in more than nine years is opened at Kilkea Castle, near Castledermot, County Kildare, and continues until its adjournment on October 31.
- September 16 – (5th waxing of Thadingyut 893 ME) In Burma (now Myanmar), the formal coronation of General Min Pa as King Min Bin of Arakan takes place in the Arakan capital, Mrauk U.
- September 24 – At the age of 35, King Gustav I Vasa of Sweden is married for the first time, taking Catherine of Saxe-Lauenburg as his bride on her 18th birthday.

==== October–December ====
- October 11 – Battle of Kappel: The forces of Zürich are defeated by the Catholic cantons. Huldrych Zwingli, the Swiss religious reformer, is killed.
- October 28 – Battle of Amba Sel: Imam Ahmad ibn Ibrahim al-Ghazi again defeats the army of Dawit II, Emperor of Ethiopia. The southern part of Ethiopia thus falls under Imam Ahmad's control.
- November 5 – Christian II`s invasion force arrives in Oslo.
- December 9 – The Virgin of Guadalupe first appears to Juan Diego at Tepeyac, Mexico City.
- December 12 – Mary, mother of Jesus, in the guise of Our Lady of Guadalupe, appears imprinted on the tilmàtli of Juan Diego Cuauhtlatoatzin, an Aztec convert to Catholicism, in Tepeyac near Mexico City.

==== Date unknown ====
- Andrea Alciato publishes Emblemata.
- Conquistador Francisco de Montejo claims Chichen Itza as capital of Spanish-ruled Yucatán.
- The University of Sarajevo is founded by Gazi Husrev-beg based on Sufi philosophy.
- Kõpu Lighthouse is completed.
- A severe drought in Henan province, China, coupled with a gigantic swarm of locusts in the summer, forces many in destitute agricultural communities to turn to cannibalism to avoid dying by starvation.
- Charles V, Holy Roman Emperor abolishes the worst abuses of the encomienda system, by pressure of Bartolomé de las Casas.
- A witch-hunt is conducted in the town of Schiltach, Germany.

=== 1532 ===
==== January–March ====
- January 22 – São Vicente is established as the first permanent Portuguese settlement in Brazil.
- February 12 – The Deceived Ones (Gl'ingannati), a stage comedy written collectively by the Accademia degli Intronati in Siena, makes its debut as part of the festivities of the Italian city's annual carnival.
- February 24 – William Warham, the 81-year-old Roman Catholic Archbishop of Canterbury, publicly declares that he is disasocciating himself from all acts of the English Parliament that are prejudicial to papal authority.
- March 18 – The Supplication against the Ordinaries is presented to Henry VIII by Thomas More the Speaker of the House of Commons. Henry responds by stating that the Commons could hardly expect such consideration after they refused to assent to the government's proposals. Shortly afterwards, Parliament is prorogued until April 10.

==== April–June ====
- April 27 – The democratic government of the Republic of Florence in Italy, in existence for more than 400 years since its founding in 1115, is abolished by order of Pope Clement VII in order for a hereditary, and absolute, monarchy to be established. Alessandro de' Medici, Duke of Florence, the illegitimate son of Pope Clement, is given full power and the Republic's parliament (the Signoria) and the rule of the executive officer, the Gonfaloniere, come to an end.
- April – Battle of Quipaipan in Peru: Atahualpa wins the civil war in the Inca Empire, defeating his brother Huáscar.
- May 13 – Francisco Pizarro lands on the northern coast of Peru.
- May 16 – Sir Thomas More resigns as Lord Chancellor of England.
- June 25 – Suleiman the Magnificent leads another invasion of Hungary.

==== July–September ====
- July 23 – The Nuremberg Religious Peace is granted to members of the Schmalkaldic League, granting them religious liberty.
- August 13 – Union of Brittany and France: The Duchy of Brittany is absorbed into the Kingdom of France.
- August 5 – The siege of Güns in the Austrian Empire begins as the Ottoman army, under Sultan Suleiman the Magnificent, attempts to take the city of Güns (now Kőszeg in Hungary) with 100,000 troops in order to mount a larger invasion of the Austrian city of Vienna, capital of the Holy Roman Empire. The defenders, less than 800 Croatian soldiers commanded by Nikola Jurišić, puts up a successful resistance despite being outnumbered by more than 100 to 1.
- August 30 – The siege of Güns fails as heavy rains and the arrival of reinforcements from Charles V, Holy Roman Emperor to supplement the Croatian defenders, causes Suleiman to retreat.
- September 1 – Anne Boleyn is created Marquess of Pembroke by her fiancé, King Henry VIII of England.

==== October–December ====
- October 7 – (9th waxing of Tazaungmon 894 ME) The Burmese monarch Min Bin, King of Arrakan, leads a combined invasion force of 12,000 people (three armies of 11,000 men in a three-pronged attack, and a flotilla of war boats carrying 1,000 troops) in an invasion of Bengal in India.
- November 16 – Francisco Pizarro and his men capture Inca emperor Atahualpa at Cajamarca, ambushing and slaughtering a large number of his followers, without loss to themselves. He subsequently offers a ransom of approximately $50 million in gold.
- December 1 – (5th waxing of Pyatho 894 ME) The Burmese Army under Min Bin marches into Dhaka, capital of Bengal without any resistance.
- December 4 – A fire strikes the cathedral in Chambéry, now a part of France, but at the time a part of Italy's Duchy of Savoy. The fire burns several holes in the Shroud of Turin, believed by some Roman Catholics to be the burial shroud of Jesus of Nazareth after the crucifixion, and to have a miraculous imprint of Jesus, but the shroud is repaired by nuns at the cathedral.
- December 20 – The first payment for Atahualpa's ransom from the Spaniards is made as gold is delivered to Cuzco to fill up a room.

==== Date unknown ====
- The Prince is published, five years after the death of the author, Niccolò Machiavelli.
- Pantagruel is published by François Rabelais.
- Henry VIII of England grants the Thorne brothers a Royal Charter to found Bristol Grammar School.
- Stamford School is founded in England by William Radcliffe.
- The Paris Parlement has the city's beggars arrested "to force them to work in the sewers, chained together in pairs".
- Possible date for the Battle of the Maule between Incas and Mapuches, according to historian Osvaldo Silva.

=== 1533 ===
==== January–March ====
- January 25 – King Henry VIII of England formally but secretly marries Anne Boleyn, who becomes his second queen consort.
- January 26 – Thomas Audley, 1st Baron Audley of Walden, is appointed Lord Chancellor of England.
- February 4 – The Reformation Parliament is summoned into session by King Henry VIII of England, and meets until April 7.
- February 8 – (15th waxing of Tabaung 894 ME) King Min Bin of Burma begins receiving tributes from the local lords of Bengal.
- February 14 – By a treaty between the German city of Münster and the Holy Roman Empire, Münster is recognized as a Lutheran city.
- February 18 – The order of the Clerics Regular of Saint Paul, more commonly called the Barnabites, is given papal approval by Pope Clement VII in the brief Vota per quae vos.
- March 30 – Thomas Cranmer becomes Archbishop of Canterbury.

==== April–June ====
- April 7 – The Statute in Restraint of Appeals in England, declaring the king to be the supreme sovereign and forbidding judicial appeals to the papacy, is given royal assent.
- April 10 – King Frederick I of Denmark, ruler of the Danes since 1523 and later elected, but never crowned, King of Norway, dies at the age of 61. The vacancy leaves a dispute over his successor, which soon becomes the Count's Feud (Grevens Fejde) between the Roman Catholic supporters of the former King Christian II of Denmark, and the Lutheran supporters of Frederick's son, proclaimed to be King Christian III.
- May 23 – King Henry VIII of England's marriage with Catherine of Aragon is declared annulled by Archbishop Cranmer. Since Pope Clement VII had rejected Henry's petition for annulment in 1530, Catherine continues to believe herself Henry's wife until her death.
- June 1
  - Cartagena, Colombia, is founded by Pedro de Heredia.
  - Cranmer crowns Anne Boleyn as queen consort of England, in Westminster Abbey.

==== July–September ====
- July 11 – Henry VIII is excommunicated by Pope Clement VII, as is Archbishop Cranmer.
- July 22 – Treaty of Constantinople between the Ottoman Empire and the Archduchy of Austria: Ferdinand I, King of the Romans, withdraws his claims to most of Hungary and János Szapolyai, voivode of Transylvania, becomes King of Hungary under the suzerainty of Suleiman the Magnificent, Sultan of the Ottoman Empire.
- July 26 – Sapa Inca Atahualpa is executed by garotte, at the orders of Francisco Pizarro in Cajamarca. While older sources stated the execution had been on August 29, 1533, it would later be determined by late 20th century historians that the August date was incorrect because the Spaniards had departed Cajamarca by August 10. The Spanish arrange for his younger brother Túpac Huallpa to be crowned as a successor, but he dies in October after an apparent poisoning.
- August 13 – King François of France dispatches Colonel Pierre de Piton to Morocco with a letter addressed to the ruler, Sultan Abu al-Abbas Ahmad ibn Muhammad, in order to establish a trade agreement.
- September 7 – Anne Boleyn, the second wife of King Henry VIII of England gives birth to a daughter, at Greenwich, a little more than three months after she and Henry were married. The King's second daughter, Elizabeth, will become the reigning monarch of England 15 years later and rule for more than 44 years.
- September 13 – Antonio Sedeño, the Spanish Colonial Governor of Trinidad, comes under attack along with his troops by the Kalinago people, indigenous to the area. Though the Spanish lose many troops, Sedeño defeats the Kalinago and puts the island under Spanish rule.

==== October–December ====
- October 28 – The 14-year olds Henry, Duke of Orléans – the future King Henry II of France – and Catherine de' Medici are married at the Église Saint-Ferréol les Augustins in Marseille.
- November 15 – Francisco Pizarro arrives in Cusco, Peru.
- December 3 – Ivan IV succeeds his father Vasili III as Grand Prince of Muscovy at the age of three; he will rule in Russia until his death in 1584.
- December 21 (Feast of St Thomas the Apostle) – Hernando de Grijalva and his crew become the first persons discover the uninhabited Revillagigedo Islands, off the Pacific coast of Mexico, reporting the finding of what Grijalva names Isla Santo Tomé, probably Socorro Island.
- December 28 – Grijalva and his crew discover Isla de los Inocentes, probably San Benedicto Island.

==== Date unknown ====
- Pechenga Monastery is founded, in the far north of the Grand Duchy of Moscow.
- 1533–1534 – Sultan Suleiman the Magnificent makes the Ruthenian harem girl Roxelana his legal wife.

=== 1534 ===
==== January–March ====
- January 15 – The Parliament of England passes the Act Respecting the Oath to the Succession, recognising the marriage of Henry VIII and Anne Boleyn, and their children as the legitimate heirs to the throne.
- February 23 – A group of Anabaptists, led by Jan Matthys, seize Münster, Westphalia and declare it The New Jerusalem, begin to exile dissenters, and forcibly baptize all others.
- March 10 – The Portuguese crown divides Colonial Brazil into fifteen donatory captaincies, hereditary titles similar to duchies.
- March 30 – The Submission of the Clergy Act 1533 becomes law in England, requiring submission of the clergy, that is, churchmen are to submit to the king and the publication of ecclesiastical laws without royal permission is forbidden.

==== April–June ====
- April 5 (Easter Sunday) – Anabaptist Jan Matthys is killed by the Landsknechte, who laid siege to Münster on the day he predicted as the Second Coming of Christ. His follower John of Leiden takes control of the city.
- April 13 – Sir Thomas More, having been brought before a royal commission to swear his allegiance to the Act of Succession, testifies that he accepts Parliament's right to declare Anne Boleyn the legitimate Queen of England, but denies that the marriage is spiritually valid of the king's second marriage". Holding fast to the Roman Catholic doctrine of papal supremacy, More refuses to take the oath of supremacy toward King Henry VIII. More is confined in the Tower of London. He will be executed on July 6, 1535.
- May 10 – Jacques Cartier explores Newfoundland, while searching for the Northwest Passage.
- June 9 – Jacques Cartier and his crew become the first Europeans to discover the Gulf of St Lawrence.
- June 23 – Copenhagen opens its gates to Count Christopher of Oldenburg, leading the army of Lübeck (and the Hanseatic League), nominally in the interests of the deposed King Christian II of Denmark. The surrenders of Copenhagen and, a few days later, of Malmö represent the high point of the Count's War for the forces of the League. These victories presumably lead the Danish nobility to recognize Christian III as King on July 4.
- June 29 – Jacques Cartier discovers Prince Edward Island.

==== July–September ====
- July 4 – The Election of Christian III, as King of Denmark, takes place in the town of Rye.
- July 7 – The first known exchange between Europeans and the natives of the Gulf of St. Lawrence occurs in what is now New Brunswick.
- July 20 – Cambridge University Press is given a Royal Charter by Henry VIII of England, and becomes the first of the privileged presses.
- August 15 – Ignatius of Loyola and six others take the vows that lead to the establishment of the Jesuits (the Society of Jesus), in Montmartre, near Paris.
- August 26 – Piero de Ponte becomes the 45th Grandmaster of the Knights Hospitaller.
- September 24– The first of Brazil's capitancias, the Capitancy of Pernambuco, is established for Pernambuco.

==== October–December ====
- October 4 – As the Michaelmas fair opens in Wittenberg, Martin Luther's translation of the complete Christian Bible into German is offered for sale for the first time. The work, printed on 1,824 pages in two volumes by Hans Lufft adds the Old Testament including the deuterocanonical books to Luther's 1522 translation of the New Testament, and includes woodcut illustrations.
- October 13 – Cardinal Alessandro Farnese is elected as the 220th pope of the Roman Catholic Church after a two-day conclave to find a successor for Pope Clement VII, who had died on September 25. Farnese, the Bishop of Ostia, takes the name Pope Paul III and is crowned on November 3.
- October 18 – Huguenots post placards all over France attacking the Catholic Mass, provoking a violent sectarian reaction (Affair of the Placards).
- November 3– The English Reformation Parliament passes the Act of Supremacy, establishing Henry VIII as supreme head of the Church of England.
- December 4 – The Ottoman army under Suleiman the Magnificent captures the city of Baghdad from the Safavids without a struggle, beginning almost 400 years of Ottoman rule of what is now Iraq.
- December 6 – Over 200 Spanish settlers, led by conquistador Sebastián de Belalcázar, found what becomes Quito, Ecuador.

==== Date unknown ====
- Manco Inca Yupanqui is crowned as Sapa Inca in Cusco, Peru by Spanish conquistador Francisco Pizarro, in succession to his brother Túpac Huallpa (d. October 1533).
- Gargantua is published by François Rabelais.
- The first book in Yiddish is printed (in Kraków), Mirkevet ha-Mishneh, a Tanakh concordance by Rabbi Asher Anchel, translating difficult phrases in biblical Hebrew.

=== 1535 ===
==== January–March ====
- January 18 – Lima, now the capital of Peru, is founded by Francisco Pizarro, as Ciudad de los Reyes.
- January 21 – The French Protestant leaders of the October 1534 Affaire des Placards are burned to death in front of the Cathedral of Notre-Dame de Paris and witnessed by a large crowd that includes King François and the visiting Ottoman diplomats.
- February 27 – George Joye publishes his Apologye in Antwerp, to clear his name from the accusations of William Tyndale.
- March 10 – Fray Tomás de Berlanga discovers the Galápagos Islands, when blown off course en route to Peru.
- March 23 – English forces under William Skeffington storm Maynooth Castle in Ireland, the stronghold of Thomas FitzGerald, 10th Earl of Kildare, after a siege that began on March 16. Skeffington shows little mercy to the 25 surviving defenders, and has them decapitated in front of the castle two days after the surrender.
- March 29 – (Tenbun 4, 26th day of 2nd month) Go-Nara, who has ruled since 1526 is formally installed as the 105th Emperor of Japan

==== April–June ====
- April 11 – The visiting Ottoman envoys to France depart from Marseille, six months after having arrived from Istanbul in October. Jean de La Forêt, the new French ambassador to the Ottoman Empire, accompanies the Ottoman fleet with his party on a French galley, and the group sails to Tunis.
- April 20 – While King Gustav Vasa of Sweden is out of the country, an unusual atmospheric phenomenon, the Vädersol, appears in the sky over the Swedish capital of Stockholm, and last for two hours. Because of uncertainty about whether the vädersol is a sign of God showing favor or disapproval of the Protestant reformation and of King Gustav himself, the Evangelical Lutheran Archbishop Olaus Petri commissions Urban Larsson to document the event in a painting, the Vädersolstavlan.
- May 4 – The first of the English Carthusian Martyrs of London, John Houghton of London, Robert Lawrence of Beauvale, and Augustine Webster of Axholme are executed at Tyburn after refusing to sign the English Oath of Supremacy. The three will be canonized 435 years later on October 25, 1970, as saints of the Roman Catholic Church, with a feast day of May 4.
- May 10 – In Amsterdam, a small troop of Anabaptists, led by the minister Jacob van Geel, attacks the city hall, in an attempted coup to seize the city. In the counter-attack by the city's militia, the burgemeester, Pieter Colijns, is killed by the rebels. In another incident this year in Amsterdam, seven men and five women walk nude in the streets; and Anabaptists rebel in other cities of the Netherlands.
- May 19 – French explorer Jacques Cartier sets sail for his second voyage to North America with three ships, 110 men, and Chief Donnacona's two sons (taken by Cartier during his first voyage).
- May 20 – William Tyndale is arrested in Antwerp for heresy, in relation to his Bible translation, and imprisoned in Vilvoorde.
- June 1 – The Conquest of Tunis by Charles V, Holy Roman Emperor, begins with the destruction of Barbarossa's fleet. Following the eventual capture of the city from the Ottoman Empire, around 30,000 inhabitants are massacred.
- June 8 – Battle of Bornholm: Combined Swedish and Danish fleets defeat the Hanseatic navy.
- June 22 – Cardinal John Fisher, Bishop of Rochester, is executed for his refusal to swear an oath of loyalty to King Henry VIII of England.
- June 24 – Münster Rebellion: The Anabaptist state of Münster is conquered and disbanded.

==== July–September ====
- July 6 – Sir Thomas More, author of Utopia and one time Lord Chancellor of England, is executed for treason, after refusing to recognize King Henry VIII as head of the English Church, and separate from the Roman Catholic Church.
- July 15 – Archdeacon Charles Reynolds (cleric), envoy to James V, Charles V, and Pope Paul III, is buried in Rome. He died of malaria while lobbying for the excommunication of King Henry VIII for heresy.
- August 17 – Pope Paul III issues a papal bull, Sublimis Deus, to appint a commission of five cardinals and three bishops to carry out a reform of the city of Rome and the Roman Curia, with unlimited powers to uproot and punish all spiritual and secular transgressions, abuses, and errors.
- September 13 – Charles V, Holy Roman Emperor, becomes the first person to pass through the new Porta Nuova in Palermo, celebrating the European conquest of the North African territory of Tunis.

==== October–December ====
- October 2 – Jacques Cartier reaches the island in the Saint Lawrence River, that eventually becomes Montreal.
- October 4 – The first complete English-language Bible is printed in Antwerp, with translations by William Tyndale and Myles Coverdale.

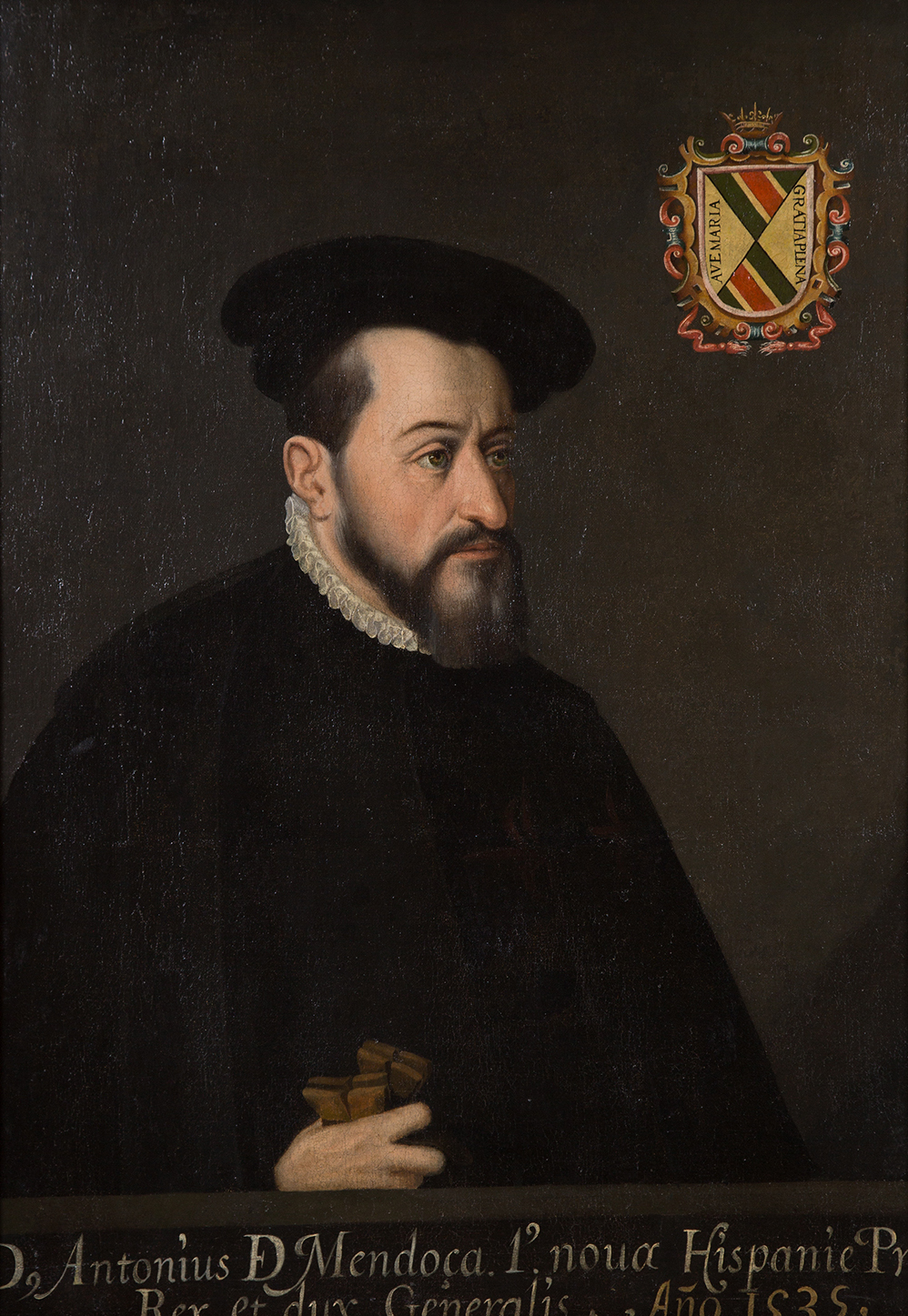
Viceroy Mendoza of New Spain

- November 1 – Eighteen days after the death of Francesco II Sforza, Charles V, Holy Roman Emperor and King of Spain Charles V claims the Duchy of Milan as his inheritance under Sforza's will. King François of France disputes the claim of Charles, citing the French right to rule Milan, Genoa and Asti, and the dispute leads to war between France and the Empire.
- November 14 –
  - Spanish colonial administrator Antonio de Mendoza is appointed as the first Viceroy of New Spain, with jurisdiction on behalf of King Carlos of Spain over a large area of what is now Mexico and the southwestern United States, from California to Louisiana, the state of Florida, most of Central America and the Caribbean, the northern parts of South America, the Philippines and Guam.
  - Voters in the Republic of Geneva approve the merger of the city's seven charitable establishments into a single entity, the Hôpital général
- November 30 – Jakob Hutter, leader of the Hutterites is arrested along with his wife in Klausen in the Tyrol region on the Italian side of the Alps. The two are taken to the prison at the fortress in Bronzolo.
- December 4 – The Consejo de i Diexe, governing body for the Republic of Venice, votes to replace the republic's treasury, made of wood, with the Zecca a structure that has stone vaults, and invites architects to submit designs.
- December 28 – James Atkenhead, the envoy of Scotland's King James V, leaves Scotland to travel to France to evaluate Mary of Bourbon, daughter of Charles, Duke of Vendôme, as a prospective queen consort. After the evaluation, and a personal visit by King James to France, the Scottish monarch decides to return to his plan to marry Madeline of Valois, daughter of King Francois of France.
- December – Manco Inca Yupanqui, nominally Sapa Inca, is imprisoned by the Spanish Conquistadors of Peru.

==== Date unknown ====
- Mughal Emperor Humayun gives battle to Bahadur Shah of Gujarat.
- Spanish forces abandon the second attempted conquest of Yucatán.
- The earliest (partially) preserved printed book in Estonian, a Catechism with a translation by Johann Koell from the Middle Low German Lutheran text of Simon Wanradt, is printed by Hans Lufft in Wittenberg, for use in Tallinn.
- Suleiman the Magnificent begins the rebuilding of the walls around Jerusalem.

=== 1536 ===
==== January–March ====
- January 6 – The Colegio de Santa Cruz de Tlatelolco, the oldest European school of higher learning in the Americas, is established by Franciscans in Mexico City.
- January 22 – John of Leiden, Bernhard Knipperdolling and Bernhard Krechting are executed in Münster for their roles in the Münster Rebellion.
- January 24 – King Henry VIII of England is seriously injured when he falls from his horse at a jousting tournament in Greenwich, after which the fully armored horse falls on him. The King is unconscious for two hours, sustaining an injury to an ulcerated leg and a concussion.
- February 2 – Spanish conquistador Pedro de Mendoza founds Buenos Aires in what is now Argentina.
- February 18 – A Franco-Ottoman alliance exempts French merchants from Ottoman law and allows them to travel, buy and sell throughout the sultan's dominions, and to pay low customs duties on French imports and exports. The compact is confirmed in 1569.
- February 25 – Tyrolean Anabaptist leader Jacob Hutter, founder of the Hutterites, is burned at the stake in Innsbruck for heresy.
- March 8 – Pargalı Ibrahim Pasha, Grand Vizier of the Ottoman Empire since 1523, is executed after falling into disfavor with Hürrem Sultan, the wife of Ottoman Sultan Suleiman the Magnificent. After Hürrem persuades her husband that Pargali Ibrahim has become a threat as his money and power have increased, Suleiman hosts an elaborate dinner with Pargali as his guest. After the dinner ends, Pargali prepares to go to bed but is seized and strangled upon reaching his bedroom.
- March 14 – Ayas Mehmed Pasha is appointed by the Sultan Suleiman to be the new Grand Vizier of the Ottoman Empire.
- March
  - The first edition of John Calvin's Institutes of the Christian Religion, a seminal work of Protestant systematic theology, is published in Basel.
  - The Italian War of 1536–1538 resumes between Francis I of France and Charles V, Holy Roman Emperor. Francis seizes control of Savoy, and captures Turin. Charles triumphally enters Rome, following the Via Triumphalis, and delivers a speech before the Pope and College of Cardinals, publicly challenging the king of France to a duel.

==== April–June ====
- April 6 – Count's Feud: Malmø surrenders to King Christian III of Denmark.
- April 14 – The Reformation Parliament in England passes an Act for the Dissolution of the Monasteries. Religious houses closed as part of Henry VIII's dissolution include: Basingwerk Abbey, Bourne Abbey, Brinkburn Priory, Buildwas Abbey, Cartmel Priory, Dorchester Abbey, Dore Abbey, Haltemprice Priory, Keldholme Priory and Tintern Abbey.
- April – An Acte for Laws & Justice to be ministred in Wales in like fourme as it is in this Realme further incorporates the legal system of Wales into that of England.
- May 2 – Anne Boleyn, second queen of Henry VIII of England, is arrested on the grounds of incest, adultery and treason.
- May 6 – Incan emperor Manco Inca Yupanqui, having on April 18 escaped from imprisonment in Cuzco, begins his revolt against his captors, when his army begins the 10-month Siege of Cuzco against a garrison of Spanish conquistadors and Indian auxiliaries, led by Hernando Pizarro.
- May 14 – Thomas Cranmer declares Henry VIII of England's marriage to Anne Boleyn to be null and void.
- May 19 – Anne Boleyn is beheaded.
- May 23 – The Inquisition is implemented in Portugal.
- May 30 – Henry VIII of England marries Jane Seymour.
- June 2 – Pope Paul III announces that he will send three legates to Charles V, Holy Roman Emperor; to King Ferdinand of Bohemia, Hungary and Croatia; and King François of France to prevent an outbreak of war in Europe.
- June 24 – San Juan Bautista del Teul is founded by Cristóbal de Oñate in New Spain.
- June 26 – Spanish navigator Andrés de Urdaneta and a few companions arrive in Lisbon from the Maluku Islands, completing a westward circumnavigation which began with the Loaísa expedition of 1525.
- June 27 – San Pedro Sula is founded by Pedro de Alvarado in Honduras.

==== July–September ====
- July 9 – The papal legation of Cardinals Marino Caracciolo, Francisco Quiñones, and Agostino Trivulzio meets with Emperor Charles V at Savigliano, south of Turin on orders of Pope Paul III.
- July 21 – The papal legation arrives in France, arriving at Lyon, to meet with King Francois I.
- July 24 – Three days after the arrival of the peacekeeping team in Lyon, and 15 days after the legation had met with the Holy Roman Emperor to avoid war, troops of the Holy Roman Empire invade France, crossing over the Var river from Nizza in Italy (now Nice in France) as well as invading Picardie with a second force.
- July 29 – The Count's Feud ends when Copenhagen surrenders to King Christian III of Denmark. On August 6 he marches into the city and on August 12 arrests the country's bishops, thus consolidating the Protestant Reformation in Denmark.
- August 5 – Guelders Wars: Battle of Heiligerlee – Danish allies of Charles II, Duke of Guelders, under command of Meindert van Ham, are defeated by Habsburg forces under Georg Schenck van Toutenburg in the Low Countries.
- August 10 – Francis III, Duke of Brittany, Dauphin of France, dies having caught a chill after a game of tennis which had developed into a fever; under torture Sebastiano de Montecuccoli, his Italian secretary, confesses to poisoning him and is brutally executed on October 7. Francis' younger brother, Henry, Duke of Orléans, succeeds as heir to the kingdom.
- September 1 – King James V of Scotland becomes the first Scottish monarch since 1346 to voluntarily leave his kingdom, leaving six vice-regents— the Lord Chancellor Gavin Dunbar, Archbishop of Glasgow; James Beaton, Archbishop of St Andrews; the earls of Huntly, Montrose, and Eglinton, and Lord Maxwell— to govern the nation during his absence. King James sails from Kirkcaldy on the Royal Scots Navy flagship Mary Willoughby, along with 500 men and five other ships, to travel to France to meet his future bride, Princess Madeleine of Valois. The Scottish entourage docks in France at Dieppe one week later.

==== October–December ====
- October 1 – The Pilgrimage of Grace, a rebellion in England against Henry VIII's church reforms, begins in as the Lincolnshire and spreads across the kingdom to most of Yorkshire, and parts of Northumberland, Durham, Cumberland, and Westmorland.
- October 6 – English Bible translator William Tyndale is burned at the stake in Vilvoorde, Brabant.
- October 10 – English barrister Robert Aske becomes the leader of the Pilgrimate of Grace rebels, whose numbers have grown to 9,000 and marches with them to York.
- October 16 – The three negotiators of Pope Paul III depart France after three months of discussions with representatives of King Francois I.
- November 4 – Cardinal Agostino Trivulzio, the envoy of Pope Paul III, files his report of his peace mission to negotiate an agreement between the Holy Roman Empire and France.
- November 13 –
  - On "a great misty morning such as hath seldom been seen", Robert Pakington, a London merchant and a member of the English Parliament, becomes the first person in Britain to be murdered with a handgun, while he is walking across the street from his home at Soper's Lane toward the Mercers' Chapel. His assailant is never caught, despite the offer of a large reward.
  - Robert Aske meets with royal delegates at York, including the Duke of Norfolk and negotiates the return of the homes of Catholic monks and nuns, as well as a safe passage for Aske and several Catholic representatives for a meeting with King Henry VIII.
- November 26 – At the Château de Blois, the marriage contract between King James V of Scotland and King Francois of France to arrange the marriage of James to Francois' daughter Madeline, is signed despite the reluctance of the French monarch to send his daughter to an unhealthy climate.
- December 5 – After two months, the Pilgrimage of Grace ends at Pontefract Castle after the Thomas Howard, 3rd Duke of Norfolk promises to present a list of 24 Articles of the pilgrims' demands, "The Commons' Petition", to King Henry VIII. The duke pledges a reprieve for abbeys from dissolution until Parliament can meet, and to obtain a general pardon for the rebel pilgrims.

==== Date unknown ====
- Battle of Reynogüelén: Spanish conquistadors defeat a group of Mapuches in Chile, during the expedition of Diego de Almagro.
- Battle of Un no Kuchi: Takeda Family forces defeat Hiraga Genshin.

=== 1537 ===
==== January–March ====
- January 1 – Princess Madeleine of Valois, the 16-year-old daughter of François I, King of France, is married to King James V of Scotland in a ceremony at the cathedral of Notre-Dame de Paris. Already in ill health at the time of the marriage, Madaleine lives only six more months before dying at the Holyrood Palace in Edinburgh on July 7.
- January 6 – Alessandro de' Medici, Duke of Florence is assassinated by Lorenzino de' Medici, a distant cousin, who claims that he wants to reintroduce republican rule but has to flee to Venice. Instead Cosimo I of the junior branch of the Medici becomes the new duke.
- January 16 – Bigod's Rebellion, an uprising by Roman Catholics, led by Francis Bigod against Henry VIII of England and Protestant Rebellion, begins with an unsuccessful attempt to seize Scarborough Castle in Yorkshire.
- January 19 – Most of Bigod's forces are captured by the English Army at a dawn raid of their camp at Beverley, Yorkshire, but Bigod escapes to Mulgrave and then to what is then the County of Cumberland.
- January – At the battle of Ollantaytambo, the Inca Emperor Manco Inca Yupanqui defeats the Spanish led by Hernando Pizarro and the Spaniards' Indian allies
- February 10 – Francis Bigod, leader of Bigod's rebellion is captured at Cumberland by the English Army and imprisoned at Carlisle Castle. He is hanged at Tyburn on June 2.
- March 8 – Chipatá, now in the Santander Department of the Republic of Colombia, is founded by the Spanish conquistadors Gonzalo Jiménez de Quesada and his brother Hernán Pérez de Quesada as the first settlement in what will become the Spanish colony of Nueva Granada, which will later be divided into the nations of Colombia and Venezuela.
- March 12 – Recife is founded by the Portuguese, in Brazil.

==== April–June ====
- April 1 – The Archbishop of Norway, Olav Engelbrektsson, flees from Trondheim to Lier, Belgium.
- April 18 – Diego de Almagro successfully charges Manco Inca's siege of Cuzco, thereby saving his antagonists, the Pizarro brothers.
- April 20 – Spanish conquest of the Muisca: Bacatá, the main settlement of the Muisca Confederation, is conquered by Gonzalo Jiménez de Quesada, effectively ending the Confederation in the Colombian Eastern Andes.
- May 17 –
  - The siege by Norwegian and Danish Protestants of Steinvikholm Castle in Norway, the former residence of the last Roman Catholic Archbishop of Norway, ended after a month when the Catholic defenders surrendered to the Danish commander, Tord Roed.{
  - The Ottoman Empire invaded southern Italy, attacking the cities of Apulia, Otranto and Brindisi, in a campaign that would last until November 22.
- June 2 – Pope Paul III publishes the encyclical Sublimis Deus, which declares the natives of the New World to be rational beings with souls, who must not be enslaved or robbed.
- June 23 – The Siege of Hamar ends with the arrest of Bishop Mogens Lauritssøn, and the Catholic rebellion is definitively ended in Norway.

==== July–September ====
- July 12– Rodrigo Orgóñez occupies and sacks the Inca center of Vitcos at the battle of Abancay, but Manco Inca Yupanqui escapes and establishes the independent Neo-Inca State elsewhere in Vilcabamba, Peru.
- July 22 – Upon the death of his father, Bhim Singh, Ratan Singh becomes the new ruler of the Kingdom of Amber with a capital at Amber in what is now the Rajasthan state in India
- July 23 – The third Ottoman–Venetian War begins as the Ottoman Sultan Suleiman the Magnificent leads an invasion of the Republic of Venice. The war will continue until October 2, 1540.
- August 2 – The battle of Montemurlo, an attempt by residents of the former Republic of Florence to overthrow Cosimo I de' Medici, Duke of Florence and restore the republican government, ends in failure. The Medici family then takes revenge on the supporters of the Republic, including the Republic commander, General Piero Strozzi.
- August 12 – The coronation of Christian III as King of Denmark and King of Norway takes place at Copenhagen.
- August 15 – The city of Asunción, now the capital of the South American nation of Paraguay, is founded by Juan de Salazar de Espinosa.
- August 25 – The Honourable Artillery Company, the oldest surviving regiment in the British Army, and the second most senior, is formed.
- August 26–The siege of the island of Corfu is started by the Ottoman Empire Navy, commanded by Suleiman the Magnificent. Suleiman abandons the siege in September after an outbreak of plague, and the Ottoman troops return home.
- September 2 – King Christian III of Denmark and Norway appoints Gjeble Pederssøn as Norway's first Lutheran bishop for the Church of Norway.
- September 12 – King Carlos I of Spain (who is also the Holy Roman Emperor) issues a royal decree providing for the first election in the New World, allowing he citizens of the Province of Rio de la Plata (now Paraguay) to elect a replacement for the late Captain-General Pedro de Mendoza. Domingo Martínez de Irala is elected the new Captain-General in 1538.

==== October–December ====
- October 15 – Following the baptism of her son, the future Edward VI of England, Jane Seymour begins suffering from puerperal fever. The Queen consort dies nine days later.

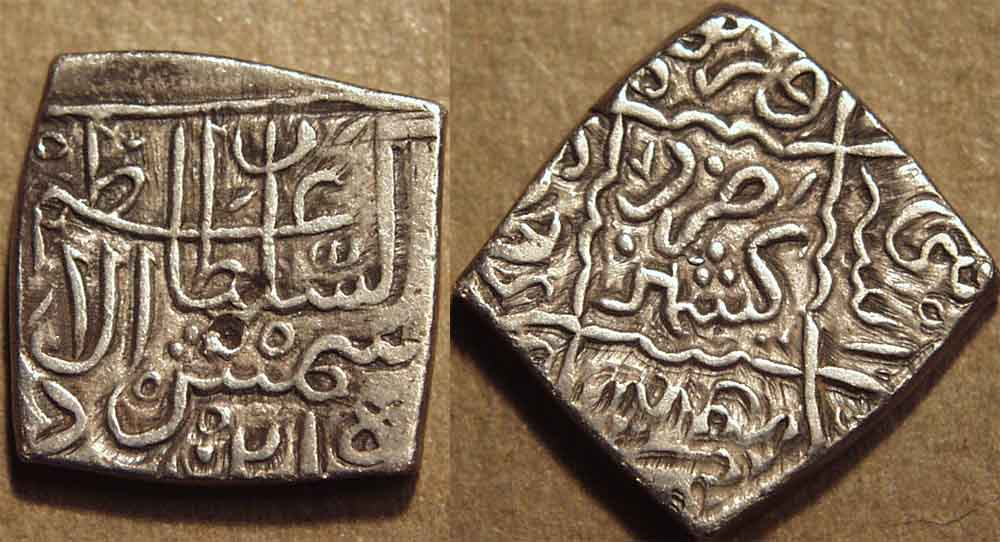
Silver coin (sasnu) of the Kashmiri sultan Shams al-Din Shah II, 1537-38

- November 1 – In what is now the Central American nation of Honduras, the Spanish conquistadore Alonso de Cáceres arrives at the Peñol de Cerquín, the mountaintop fortress of King Lempira of the Lencas, the indigenous leader of the resistance against European rule. Cáceres sends envoys to request Lempira to surrender. In response, Lempira has the Spanish messengers executed.
- November 27 – Alfonso d'Avalos, the Marquis of Vasto in Italy, enters into a three-month truce with the French Duke of Montmorency to negotiate a peace for which areas would be under French control.
- December 9 – Petar Keglević takes office as the new Ottoman Governor of Croatia and of Slavonia.
- December 28 – The Ordonnance de Montpellier, establishing the first system in Europe for all writers to submit copies of their printed work to the government for review and maintenance in a library, is signed into law by King François I of France. The law provides that a book cannot be legally sold until a copy has been deposited in the royal library.

==== Date unknown ====
- Spanish counquistadors in what are now Peru and Colombia become the first Europeans to discover the potato, one of the staple foods for the indigenous residents, while exploring the houses of who have fled from their homes. Pedro Cieza de León, part of the expedition to Colombia, mentions the potato in a book that he publishes 16 years later while Don Juan Castellanos refers to the edible plant as part of a military report on raiding an Inca village in Peru. The potato is introduced to Europe more than 30 years later, in 1570.
- Kashmiri sultan Muhammad Shah dies and he is succeeded by Shams al-Din Shah II as sultan of Kashmiri Shah Mir Sultanate in 1537.
- Kiritimati (Acea or "Christmas Island") is probably sighted by the Spanish mutineers from Hernando de Grijalva's expedition.
- The Indian city of Bangalore is first mentioned in print. .
- The dissolution of the monasteries takes place in Norway, as religious organizations are dissolved by King Christian III; these include Bakke Abbey, Munkeby Abbey, Tautra Abbey, Nidarholm Abbey, Gimsøy Abbey and Utstein Abbey.
- Publication is made of two complete Bible translations into English, both based on Tyndale's. Myles Coverdale's 1535 text is the first to be printed in England (by James Nicholson in Southwark, London) The Matthew Bible, edited by John Rogers under the pseudonym "Thomas Matthew" and printed in Antwerp.

==== Ongoing ====
- Dissolution of the monasteries in England: Religious organizations dissolved by Henry VIII of England include: Bisham Priory, Castle Acre Priory, Chertsey Abbey, Furness Abbey, London Charterhouse and Valle Crucis Abbey.

=== 1538 ===
==== January–March ====
- January 14 – Leonard Grey, England's Lord Deputy of Ireland, successfully negotiates a truce in the semi-independent County Laois, formerly an Irish Kingdom, over the areas leadership. between Peter O'Moore and Rory Lysaght.
- January 31 – General Johann Katzianer of the Holy Roman Empire, on trial in Vienna for the disastrous Imperial campaign against the Ottoman Empire and for desertion during the Battle of Gorjani, escapes and flees to Kostajnica Fortress in Ottoman-controlled Croatia. After 14 months, Nikola IV Zrinski have Katzianer murdered.
- February 8 – The Holy League, an alliance of Christian nations (the Papal States and the Republic of Venice, the Knights Hospitaller of Malta, Spain and the Spanish-ruled Viceroyalty of Naples and Sicily, is agreed upon under the direction of Pope Paul III and Venetian Senator Alvise Badoer.
- February 24 – Treaty of Nagyvárad: Peace is declared between Ferdinand I, future Holy Roman Emperor and the Ottoman Empire. John Zápolya is recognized as King of Hungary (Eastern Hungarian Kingdom), while Ferdinand retains the northern and western parts of the Kingdom, and is recognized as heir to the throne.
- March 18 – Garcia de Noronha is appointed as the new Governor-General of Portuguese India by King João III. He sails to Goa and arrives less than three weeks later.

==== April–June ====
- April 6 – In India,Sher Shah Suri, who had been the Mughal Empire's Governor of the Bihar Subah province, declares the founding of the Sur Empire and crowns himself as Emperor in a ceremony at Delhi.
- April 26 – Battle of Las Salinas: In Peru, Almagro is defeated by Francisco Pizarro, who then seizes Cusco.
- May 9 – Mary of Guise is wed by proxy to King James V of Scotland, while she is at the Château de Châteaudun and he is in London, with neither of the two seeing each other.
- May 10 – In India Mahmud Khan, 11-year-old the nephew of the late Sultan Bahadur Shah, is enthroned as Mahmud Shah III, Sultan of Gujarat.
- May 27 – A joint delegation of Lutherans from various German cities arrives in England for meetings with King Henry VIII; Thomas Cranmer, Archbishop of Canterbury; and Thomas Cromwell, the former Chief Minister of England.
- June 18 –
  - Truce of Nice: Peace is declared between Emperor Charles V and Francis I of France.
  - The formal wedding of Mary of Guise and King James V of Scotland takes place at St Andrews Cathedral.
- June 19 – Dissolution of the Monasteries in England: The newly founded Bisham Abbey is dissolved.

==== July–September ====
- July 17 – The betrothal ceremony of 12-year-old Princess Elisabeth, niece of Charles V, Holy Roman Emperor to the 17-year-old Prince Sigismund II Augustus, son of King Sigismund of Poland (who is also the Grand Duke of Lithuania) and heir to the throne, takes place in Innsbruck. The two are married five years later on May 5, 1543.
- July 25 – The city of Guayaquil, now the largest city in the South American nation of Ecuador is founded by Spanish conqueror Francisco de Orellana in the location of a Quechua native village of the same name. Orellana names the city "Santiago de Guayaquil".
- August 6 – Bogotá, Colombia is founded by Gonzalo Jiménez de Quesada.
- September 18 – Ştefan V Lăcustă of the Bogdan-Musat dynasty in Romania is appointed as the new Prince of Moldavia by the Ottoman Sultan Suleiman, replacing uncle, Petru Rareș.
- September 28 – Battle of Preveza: The Ottoman fleet of Suleiman the Magnificent, under the command of Hayreddin Barbarossa, defeats the Holy League of Emperor Charles V, under the command of Andrea Doria.
- September 29– The last significant volcanic eruption in the Phlegraean Fields of Italy begins and lasts one week.

==== October–December ====
- October 6 – The eruption the Italian volcano ends after seven days, having created Monte Nuovo.
- October 28 – The first university of the New World, the Universidad Santo Tomás de Aquino, is founded on the island of Hispaniola in Santo Domingo.
- November 5 – The siege of the Indian city of Diu ends as the Gujarat and Ottoman forces withdraw from the Portuguese held city.
- November 30
  - Sucre, Bolivia, is founded under the name Ciudad de la Plata de la Nueva Toledo.
  - Dissolution of the Monasteries in England: Byland Abbey is dissolved.
- December 17 – Pope Paul III confirms the excommunication of Henry VIII of England from the Roman Catholic church.

==== Date unknown ====
- Michelangelo starts work on the Piazza del Campidoglio on the Capitoline Hill in Rome.
- The first in a decade-long series of severe famines and epidemics sweep central and southeastern China during the Ming dynasty, made worse by a decision of 1527 to cut back on the intake of grain quotas for granaries.
- In China, a tsunami floods over the seawall in Haiyan County of Zhejiang province, inundating fields with saltwater, ruining many acres of crops. This drives up the price of foodstuffs, and many are forced to live off of tree bark and weeds (as Wang Wenlu states in his writing of 1545).

=== 1539 ===
==== January–March ====
- January 4 – Giannandrea Giustiniani Longo is elected two a two year term as Doge of the Republic of Genoa in Italy, succeeding Giovanni Battista Doria.
- January 12 – Treaty of Toledo: Charles V, Holy Roman Emperor (and Charles I of Spain) and Francis I of France agree to make no further alliances with England. The treaty comes after Henry VIII of England's split with Rome and Pope Paul III.
- January – Toungoo–Hanthawaddy War – Battle of Naungyo, Burma: The Toungoos decisively defeat the Hanthawaddys.
- February 9 – The first horse race is held at Chester Racecourse, the oldest in use in England.
- March 1 – King Henry VIII of England summons Parliament to meet, with the session to start on April 28.
- March 2 – Askia Isma'il, ruler of the Songhai Empire in West Africa, dies after a reign of slightly less than two years and is succeeded by Askia Ishaq I.
- March 30 – Canterbury Cathedral surrenders, and reverts to its previous status of 'a college of secular canons.

==== April–June ====
- April 17 – At Dresden in Germany, Heinrich IV of the House of Wettin, nicknamed "Heinrich der Fromme" (Henry the Pious) becomes the new Duke of Saxony within the Holy Roman Empire upon the death of his older brother, Georg der Bärtige ("George the Bearded").
- April 19 – The Treaty of Frankfurt is signed at Frankfurt-am-Main by Charles V, Holy Roman Emperor on behalf of the Empire's Roman Catholic states, and the Lutheran theologian Philip Melanchthon, representative of the Schmalkaldic League of Protestant German states. Effective May 1, the parties agree that no violent actions will be taken by either side against the other during a 15 month truce period.
- April 28 – The English Parliament meets for the first time since 1536, after being summoned by King Henry VIII as his seventh Parliament.
- May 5 – The English House of Lords creates a committee, balanced between religious reformers and religious conservatives, to examine and determine doctrine, eventually forming the "Six Articles".
- May 25 – The inaugural declaration of the Protestant Reformation takes place in Leipzig (now part of Germany) with Martin Luther present, as Duke Henry IV pledges to adopt Lutheranism as the official religion of make the Duchy of Saxony.
- May 30 – Hernando de Soto lands at Tampa Bay, Florida with 600 soldiers, with the goal of finding gold. He also introduces pigs into North America.
- June 26 – Battle of Chausa in modern-day Buxar, India: Sher Shah Suri defeats the Mughal emperor, Humayun (Sher Shah goes on to form the Sur Empire, and take control of nearly all Mughal territory).
- June 28 – The Six Articles, an Act of the Parliament of England, is given royal assent reaffirms certain Catholic principles in Henry VIII's Church of England.

==== July–September ====
- July 13 – Lütfi Pasha becomes the new Grand vizier of the Ottoman Empire after being appointed by the Sultan Suleiman the Great following the death of Ayas Mehmed Pasha
- July 18 – The siege of Castelnuovo (now the town of Herceg Novi in Montenegro) is started by General Hayreddin Barbarossa, leader of the Ottoman Empire's Army, after the Spanish commanding officer, Francisco de Sarmiento, rejects an offer of honorable surrender with safe passage. Spain had taken the city in war from the Ottomans in 1538, giving the Christian Europeans control of the eastern Mediterranean sea and access to the Holy Land. With 50,000 Ottomans against less than 4,000 Spanish defenders, Castelnuovo falls in less than three weeks.
- The siege of Castelnuovo ends after 19 days and the deaths of as many as 20,000 of the Ottoman attackers. After the city falls, almost all of the surviving Spanish defenders are executed, including Spain's General de Sarmiento.
- August 15 – King Francis I of France issues the Ordinance of Villers-Cotterêt, that places the whole of France under the jurisdiction of the royal law courts, and makes French the language of those courts, and the official language of legal discourse.
- August 17 – The revolt of Ghent begins in the Spanish Netherlands (now Belgium as members of the city's guilds demand the right to choose their own leaders, and the resignation of the Spanish-sponsored city leaders. Within four days, the city is under the control of nine guild leaders.
- September 7 – Guru Angad Dev becomes the second Guru of the Sikhs.

==== October–December ====
- October 4 – Henry VIII contracts to marry Anne of Cleves.
- November 1 – Joachim II Hector introduces Lutheranism in the Margraviate of Brandenburg, becoming the second Prince-Elector after the Prince-Elector of Saxony to turn Protestant.
- November 26 – Abbot Marmaduke Bradley and 31 monks sign the deed surrendering Fountains Abbey to the English Crown.
- December 7 – Juan Pardo de Tavera, Archbishop of Toledo, begins his administration as the Grand Inquisitor of Spain.
- December 15 – In the Spanish colony of Nueva Granada (now the Republic of Colombia, Spanish conquistador Baltasar Maldonado and his troops fight a final battle at Duitama (now the Boyacá Department) against the indigenous armies of the Muisca Confederation, led by Tundama.
- December 27 – Anne of Cleves arrives in England in fulfillment of the October 4 contract for marriage to King Henry VIII and the payment of a dowry of 100,000 florins to her brother. The Anne and Henry are married 10 days later, but the marriage is annulled on July 12.

==== Undated ====
- Protestant Reformation
  - Lutheranism is forcibly introduced into Iceland, despite the opposition of Bishop Jón Arason.
  - Beaulieu Abbey, Bolton Abbey, Colchester Abbey, Newstead Abbey, St Albans Abbey, St Mary's Abbey, York and Hartland Abbey (the last) fall prey to the Dissolution of the Monasteries in England.
  - The first edition of the Calvinist Genevan Psalter is published.
- In Henan province, China, a severe drought with swarms of locusts is made worse, by a major epidemic outbreak of the plague.
- The first printing press in North America is set up in Mexico City.
- Teseo Ambrogio's Introductio in Chaldaicam lingua, Syriaca atq Armenica, & dece alias linguas, published in Pavia, introduces several Middle Eastern languages to western Europe for the first time.

== Births ==
1530

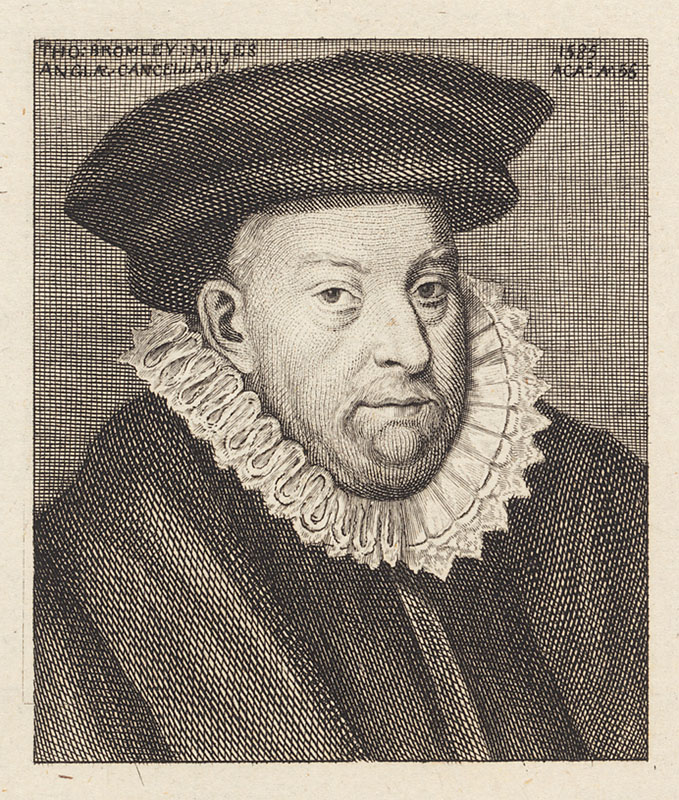
Sir Thomas Bromley

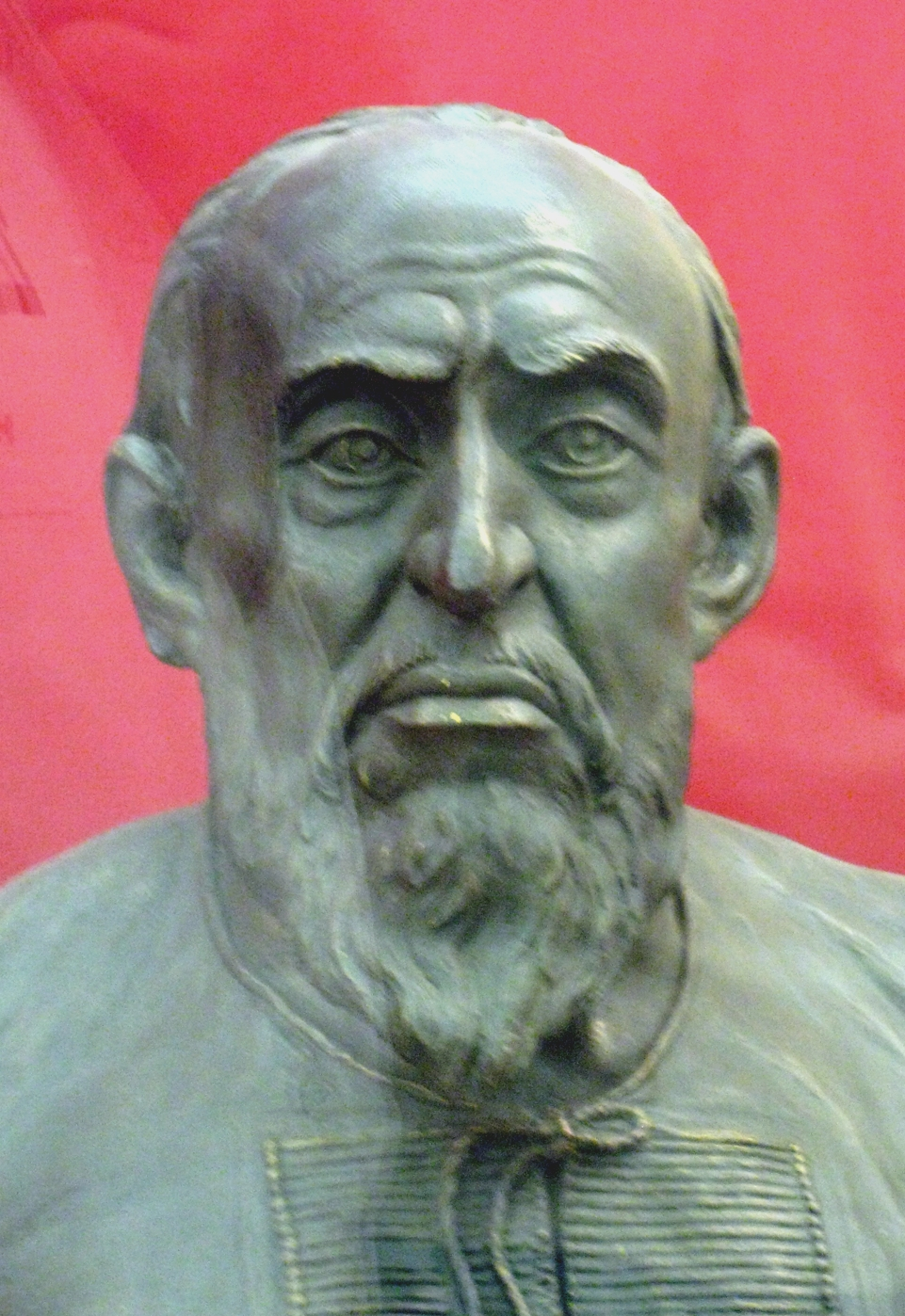
Ivan the Terrible

- January 5 – Gaspar de Bono, Spanish monk of the Order of the Minims (d. 1571)
- January 31 – Ōtomo Sōrin, Japanese Christian Daimyō (d. 1587)
- February 17 – Louis III, Count of Löwenstein (d. 1611)
- February 18 – Uesugi Kenshin, Japanese samurai and warlord (d. 1578)
- February 26 – David Chytraeus, German historian and theologian (d. 1600)
- March 11 – Johann Wilhelm, Duke of Saxe-Weimar (d. 1573)
- May 5 – Gabriel, comte de Montgomery, French nobleman (d. 1574)
- May 7 – Louis I de Bourbon, Prince de Condé, French Protestant general (d. 1569)
- June 17 – François de Montmorency, French nobleman (d. 1579)
- June 20 – Johannes Schenck von Grafenberg, German physician (d. 1598)
- July 3 – Claude Fauchet, French historian (d. 1602)
- August 1 – Daniel, Count of Waldeck (d. 1577)
- August 11 – Ranuccio Farnese, Italian prelate (d. 1565)
- August 14 – Giambattista Benedetti, Italian mathematician and physicist (d. 1590)
- August 25 – Ivan IV of Russia (d. 1584)
- September 30 – Geronimo Mercuriale, Italian philologist and physician (d. 1606)
- October 1 – Walter Aston, English politician (d. 1589)
- October 21 – Jacques Jonghelinck, Flemish sculptor (d. 1606)
- October 30 – Charles d'Angennes de Rambouillet, Roman Catholic cardinal (d. 1587)
- November 1 – Étienne de La Boétie, French judge and writer (d. 1563)
- November 6 – Josias Simler, Swiss scholar (d. 1576)
- December 1 – Bernardino Realino, Italian Jesuit (d. 1616)
- December 5 – Nikolaus Selnecker, German musician (d. 1592)
- date unknown
  - Julius Caesar Aranzi, Italian anatomist (d. 1589)
  - Vincenza Armani, Italian actress (d. 1569)
  - Christopher Báthory, Prince of Transylvania (d. 1581)
  - Jean Bodin, French jurist (d. 1596)
  - Wawrzyniec Grzymała Goślicki, Polish bishop, political thinker and philosopher (d. 1607)
  - Thomas Hoby, English diplomat and translator (d. 1566)
  - Kōriki Kiyonaga, Japanese daimyō in the Azuchi-Momoyama and Edo periods (d. 1608)
  - Jan Kochanowski, Polish writer (d. 1584)
  - Jean Nicot, French diplomat and scholar (d. 1606)
  - Mordecai Yoffe, Bohemian author of Levush Malkhut (d. 1612)
  - Anastasia Romanovna, Russian Tsaritsa (d. 1560)
  - Thomas Bromley, English lord chancellor (d. 1587)
- probable
  - Moses Isserles, Polish rabbi and Talmudist (d. 1572)
  - Claude Le Jeune, French composer (d. 1600)
  - Gráinne O'Malley, Irish ruler (d. 1603)
  - Teodora Ginés, Dominican musician and composer (d. 1598)
  - Shane O'Neill, Irish chieftain and rebel (d. 1567)
  - Turlough Luineach O'Neill, Irish chieftain of Tyrone (d. 1595)
  - Jöran Persson, Swedish politician (d. 1568)
  - Nicholas Sanders, English Catholic propagandist (d. 1581)
  - Ruy López de Segura, Spanish priest and chess player (d. 1580)
  - Pey de Garros, Provençal poet (d. 1585)

1531

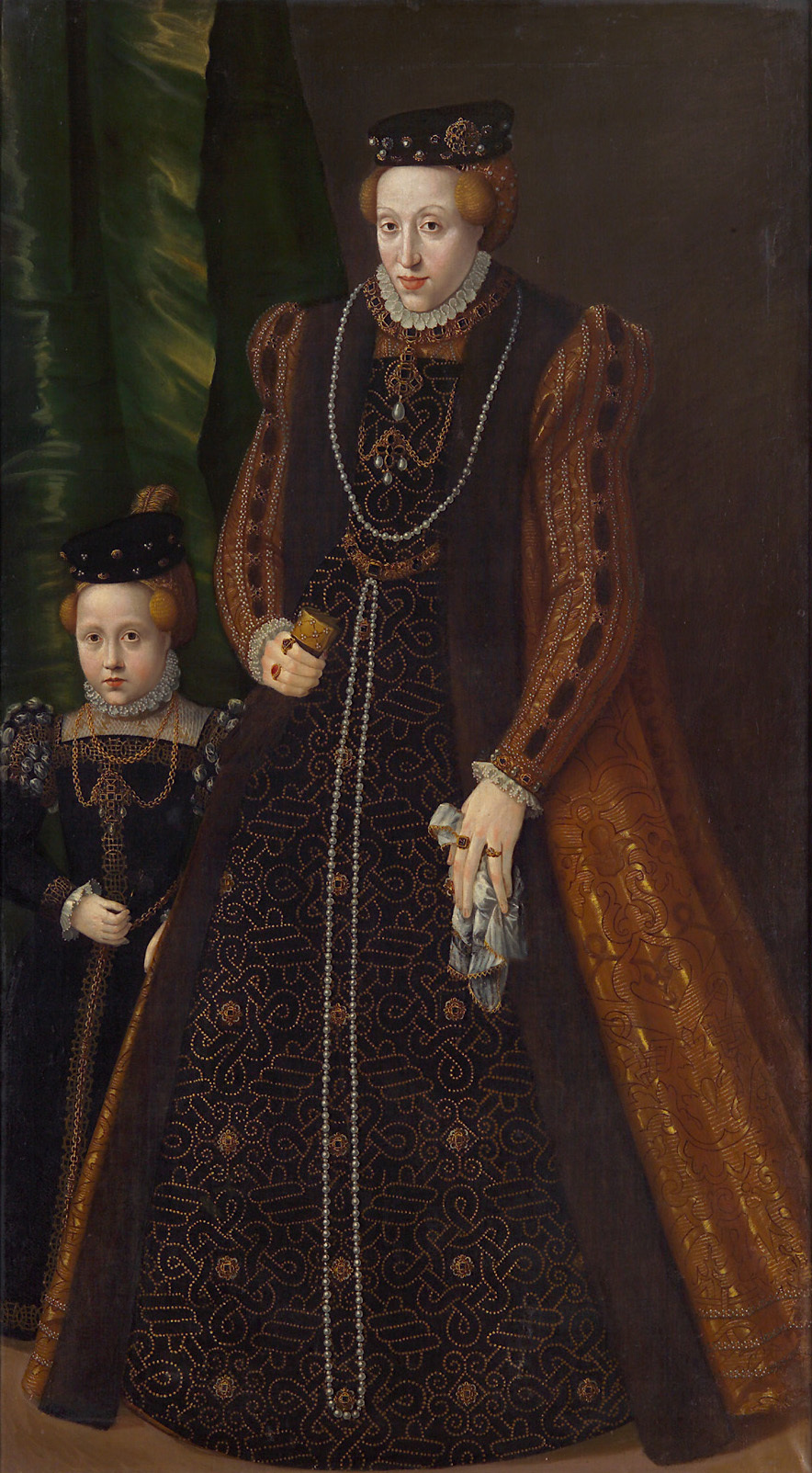
Maria of Austria, Duchess of Jülich-Cleves-Berg

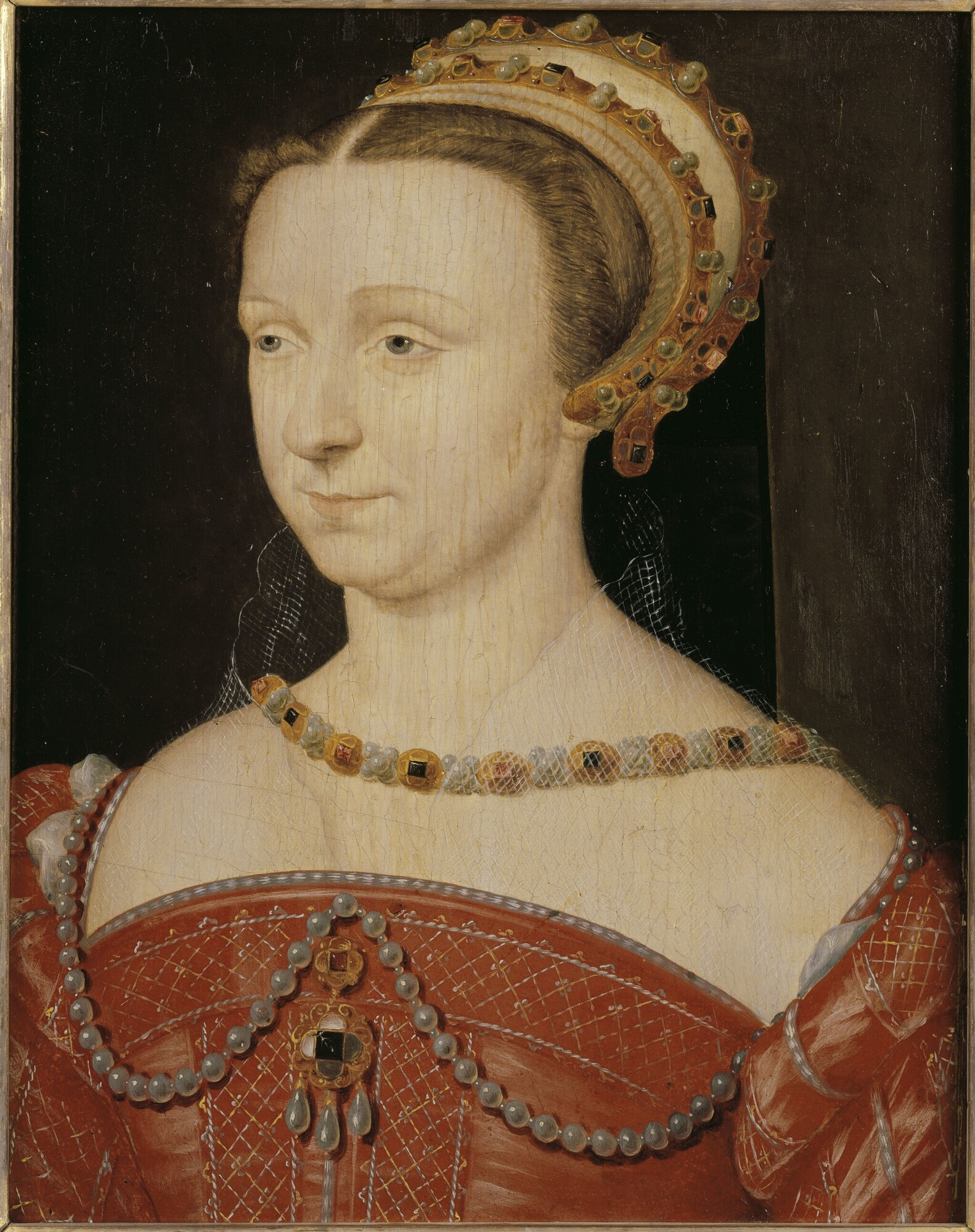
Anna d'Este

- January 26 – Jens Bille, Danish servant and poet (d. 1575)
- April 6 – Wolfgang, Duke of Brunswick-Grubenhagen (d. 1595)
- May 15 – Maria of Austria, Duchess of Jülich-Cleves-Berg, daughter of Emperor Ferdinand I (d. 1581)
- May 20 – Viceroy Thado Minsaw of Ava (d. 1584)
- June 1 – János Zsámboky, Hungarian scholar (d. 1584)
- July 17 – Antoine de Créqui Canaples, French Catholic cardinal (d. 1574)
- July 22 – Leonhard Thurneysser, German scholar and quack at the court of John George, Elector of Brandenburg (d. 1595)
- September 2 – Francesco Cattani da Diacceto, Bishop of Fiesole (d. 1595)
- September 4 – Hans Fugger, German businessman (d. 1598)
- September 14 – Philipp Apian, German mathematician and medic (d. 1589)
- Late September – Henry Stanley, 4th Earl of Derby, English noble and diplomat (d. 1594)
- October 7 – Scipione Ammirato, Italian historian (d. 1601)
- October 12 – Jacques de Savoie, 2nd Duc de Nemours (d. 1585)
- October 25 – Matthew Wesenbeck, Belgian jurist (d. 1586)
- October 27 – Herbert Duifhuis, Dutch minister (d. 1581)
- November 14 – Richard Topcliffe, English torturer (d. 1604)
- November 16 – Anna d'Este, duchess consort of Nemours (d. 1607)
- November 18 – Roberto di Ridolfi, Italian conspirator against Elizabeth I of England (d. 1612)
- November 29 – Johannes Letzner, German Protestant priest and historian (d. 1613)
- December – Hendrick van Brederode, Dutch noble (d. 1568)
- December 6 – Vespasiano I Gonzaga, Italian noble and diplomat (d. 1591)
- December 10 – Henry IX, Count of Waldeck (d. 1577)
- date unknown
  - Akiyama Nobutomo, Japanese nobleman (d. 1575)
  - António, Prior of Crato, claimant to the throne of Portugal (d. 1595)
  - John Popham, Lord Chief Justice of England (d. 1607)
  - Şehzade Cihangir, Ottoman prince (d. 1553)

1532

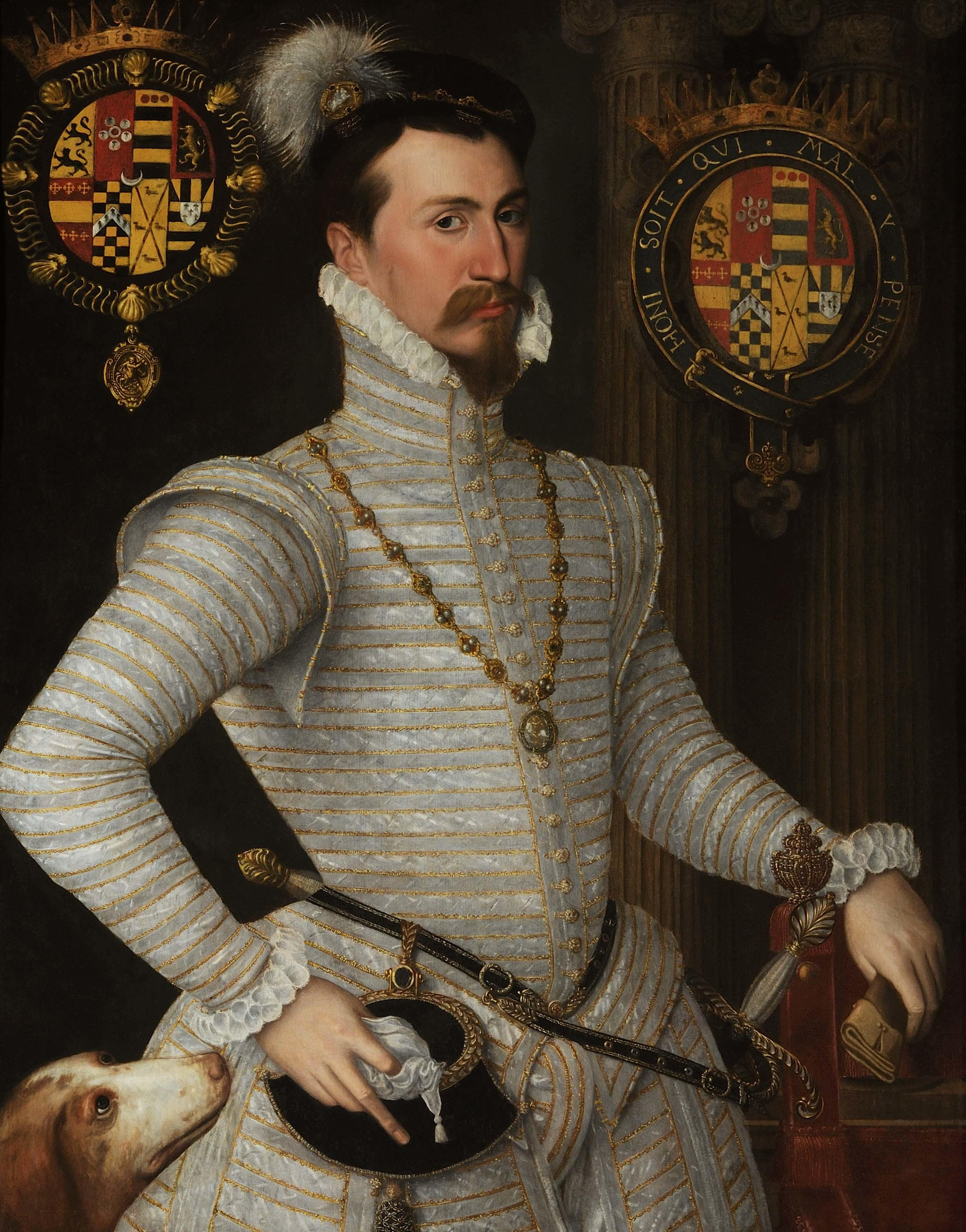
Robert Dudley, 1st Earl of Leicester

- January 21 – Ludwig Helmbold, German classical singer (d. 1598)
- February 14 – Richard Lowther, English soldier and official (d. 1607)
- February 19 – Jean-Antoine de Baïf, French poet and member of the Pléiade (d. 1589)
- March 20 – Juan de Ribera, Spanish Catholic archbishop (d. 1611)
- March 25 – Pietro Pontio, Italian music theorist and composer (d. 1596)
- April 21 – Martin Schalling the Younger, German theologian (d. 1608)
- April 23 – Anna Marie of Brunswick-Lüneburg, Duchess of Prussia (d. 1568)
- June 1 – Marino Grimani, Doge of Venice (d. 1605)
- June 6 – Giulio Antonio Santorio, Italian Catholic cardinal (d. 1602)
- June 7 – Amy Robsart, wife of Robert Dudley, 1st Earl of Leicester (d. 1560)
- June 13 – Countess Palatine Helena of Simmern, countess consort of Hanau-Münzenberg (1551-1561) (d. 1579)
- June 16 – Francis Coster, Brabantian Jesuit theologian, author (d. 1619)
- June 24
  - Robert Dudley, 1st Earl of Leicester, English politician (probable; d. 1588)
  - William IV, Landgrave of Hesse-Kassel, German Protestant leader (d. 1592)
- July 12 – Mechthild of Bavaria, German duchess (d. 1565)
- July 25 – Alphonsus Rodriguez, Spanish Jesuit lay brother and saint (d. 1617)
- August 14 – Archduchess Magdalena of Austria, Member of the House of Habsburg (d. 1590)
- October 4 – Francisco de Toledo, Spanish Jesuit cardinal (d. 1596)
- October 30 – Yuri of Uglich, Prince of Uglich (d. 1563)
- November 16 – Clara of Brunswick-Wolfenbüttel, Abbess of Gandersheim, later Duchess of Brunswick-Grubenhagen (d. 1595)
- November 22 – Anne of Denmark, Electress of Saxony (d. 1585)
- December 7 – Louis I, Count of Sayn-Wittgenstein (d. 1605)
- December 20
  - John Günther I, Count of Schwarzburg-Sondershausen (d. 1586)
  - Orazio Samacchini, Italian painter (d. 1577)
- December 26 – Guilielmus Xylander, German classical scholar (d. 1576)
- date unknown
  - Robert Abercromby, Scottish Jesuit missionary (d. 1613)
  - William Allen, English cardinal (d. 1594)
  - Hernando Franco, Spanish composer (d. 1585)
  - Luís Fróis, Portuguese missionary (d. 1597)
  - Pedro Sarmiento de Gamboa, Spanish explorer (d. 1592)
  - John Hawkins, English navigator and slave trader (d. 1595)
  - Étienne Jodelle, French dramatist and poet (d. 1573)
  - Ralph Lane, English explorer (d. 1603)
  - Henry Percy, 8th Earl of Northumberland (d. 1585)
  - Thomas Norton, English lawyer (d. 1584)
  - Tulsidas, medieval Hindi poet and philosopher (d. 1623)
  - Flavio Orsini, Italian Catholic cardinal (d. 1581)
  - Thomas Lucy, English politician (d. 1600)
- probable
  - Sofonisba Anguissola, Italian portrait painter (d. 1625)
  - Orlande de Lassus, Flemish composer (d. 1594)

1533

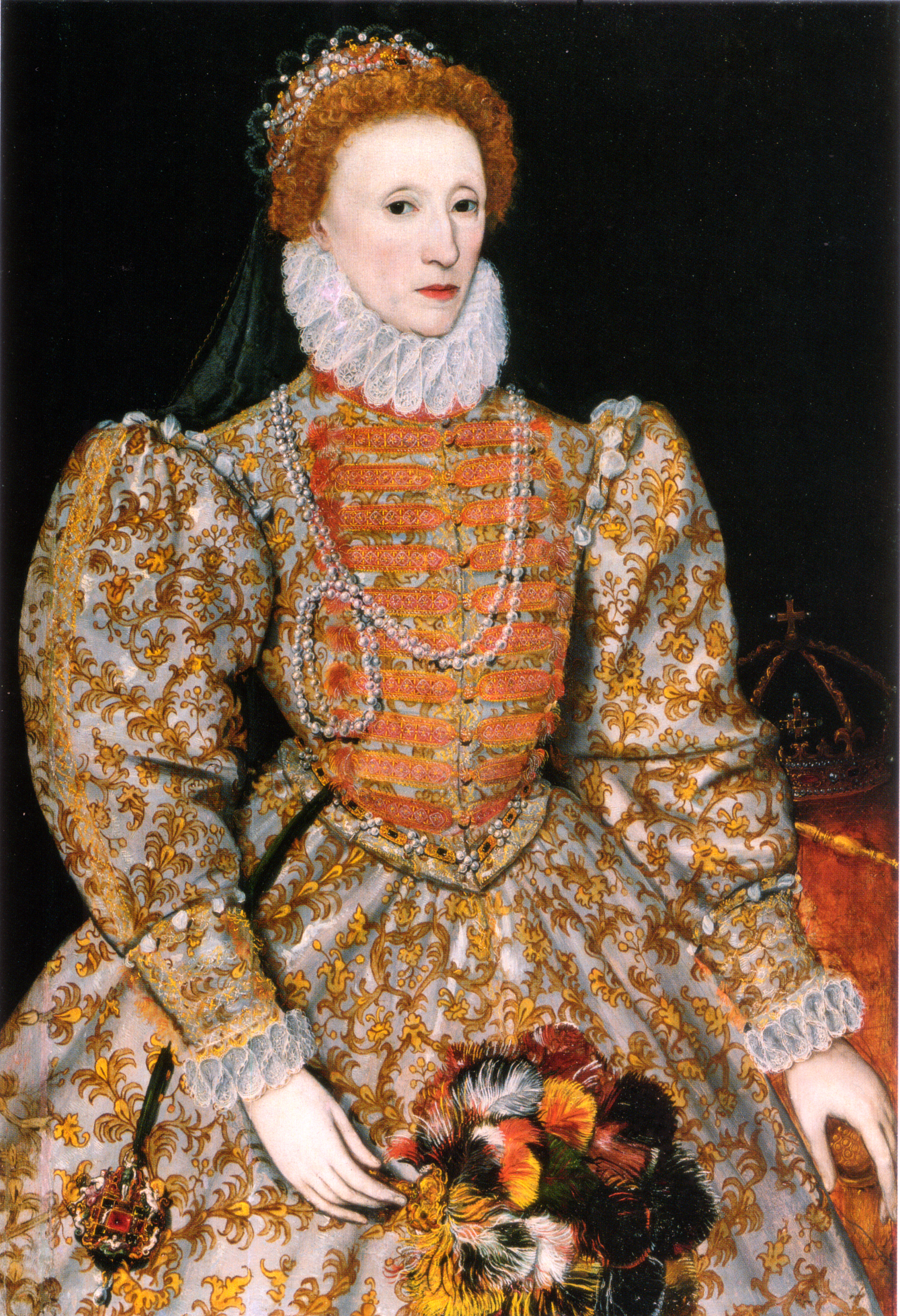
Queen Elizabeth I

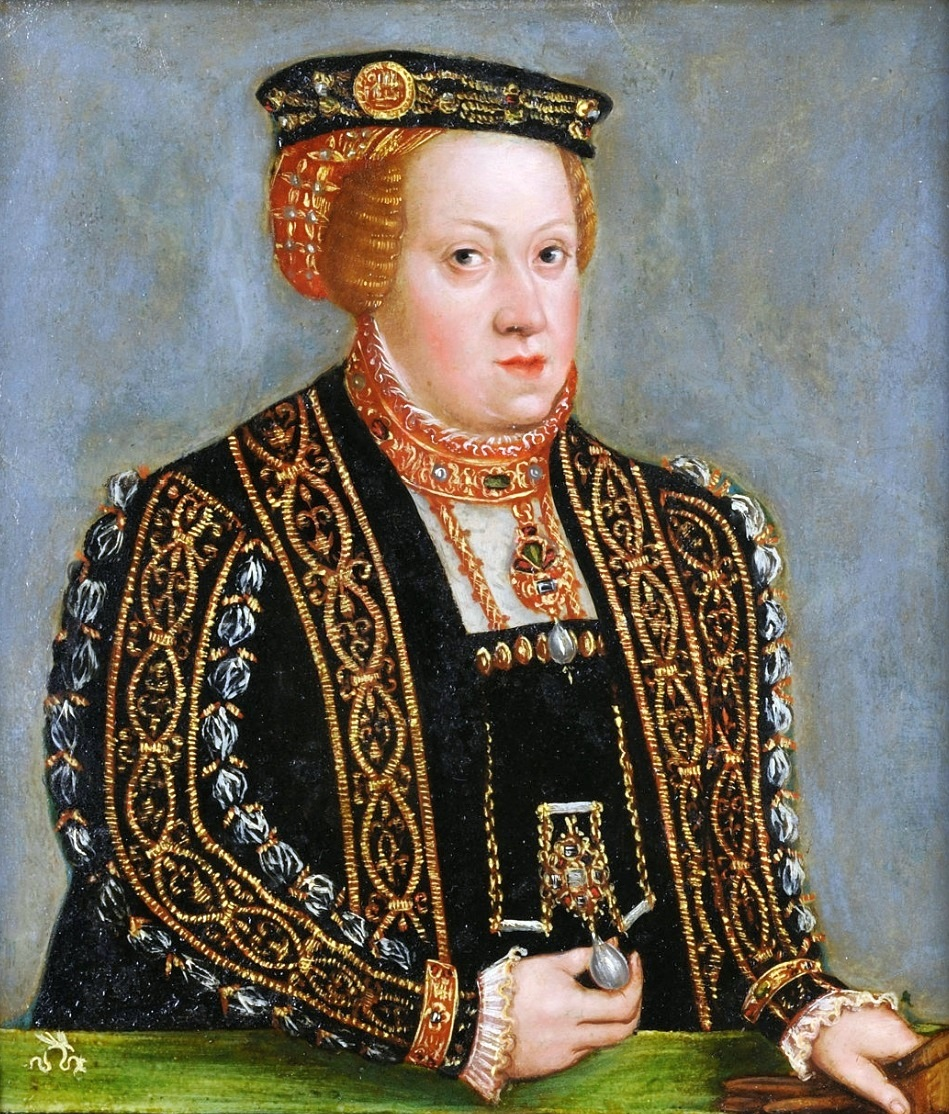
Catherine of Austria, Queen of Poland

- January 2 – Johann Major, German poet and theologian (d. 1600)
- January 3 – Jerónimo Bautista Lanuza, Spanish friar, bishop and writer (d. 1624)
- January 6 – Timotheus Kirchner, German theologian (d. 1587)
- January 28 – Paul Luther, German scientist (d. 1593)
- February 5 or February 16 – Andreas Dudith, Croatian-Hungarian nobleman and diplomat (d. 1589)
- February 2 – Shimazu Yoshihisa, Japanese samurai (d. 1611)
- February 16 – Gianfrancesco Gambara, Italian Catholic cardinal (d. 1587)
- February 28 – Michel de Montaigne, French essayist (d. 1592)
- March 10 – Francesco III Gonzaga, Duke of Mantua (d. 1550)
- April 5 – Giulio della Rovere, Italian Catholic cardinal (d. 1578)
- April 8 – Claudio Merulo, Italian composer and organist (d. 1604)
- April 24 – William I of Orange (d. 1584)
- May 2 – Philip II, Duke of Brunswick-Grubenhagen (d. 1596)
- July 20 – Martín de Rada, Spanish missionary (d. 1578)
- July 10 – Antonio Possevino, Italian diplomat (d. 1611)
- August 2 – Theodor Zwinger, Swiss scholar (d. 1588)
- August 7
  - Alonso de Ercilla y Zúñiga, Basque soldier and poet (d. 1595)
  - Valentin Weigel, German theologian (d. 1588)
- September 5 – Jacopo Zabarella, Italian philosopher (d. 1589)
- September 7 – Queen Elizabeth I of England, daughter of King Henry VIII of England (d. 1603)
- September 15 – Catherine of Austria, Queen of Poland (d. 1572)
- September 27 – Stefan Batory, King of Poland (d. 1586)
- October 9 – Henry V, Burgrave of Plauen (d. 1568)
- October 12 – Asakura Yoshikage, Japanese ruler (d. 1573)
- October 14 – Anna of Mecklenburg, duchess consort of Courland (1566-1587) (d. 1602)
- November 22 – Alfonso II d'Este, Duke of Ferrara, Italian noble (d. 1597)
- December 13 – King Eric XIV of Sweden (d. 1577)
- date unknown – Eknath, Indian Marathi saint (d. 1599)
- probable
  - Amina, Queen of Zazzua (d. 1610)
  - Cornelis Cort, Dutch engraver (d. 1578)
  - David Rizzio, Italian secretary of Mary, Queen of Scots (k. 1566)

1534

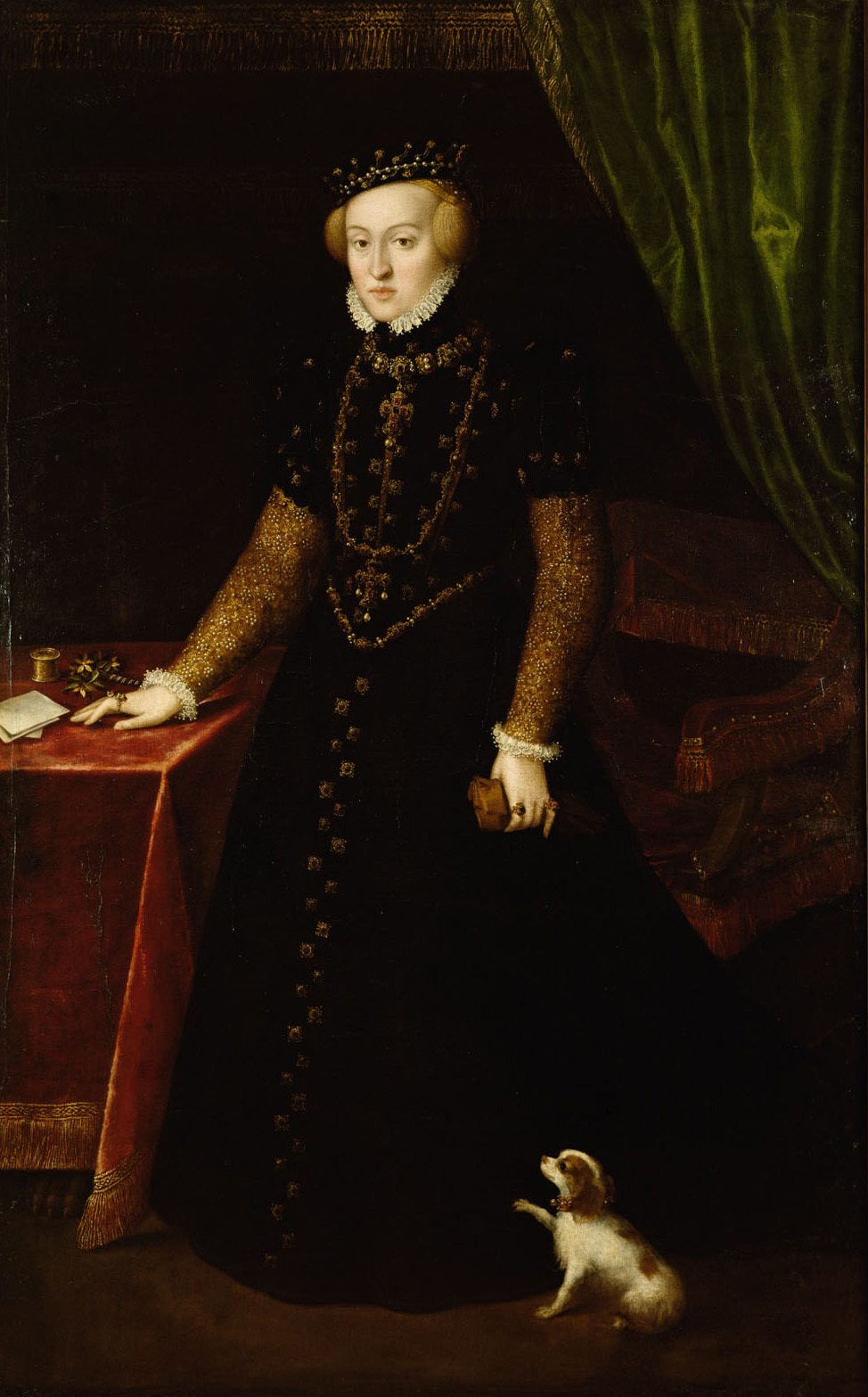
Archduchess Eleanor of Austria

- January 6 – Pavao Skalić, Croatian encyclopedist, Renaissance humanist and adventurer (d. 1575)
- February 5 – Giovanni de' Bardi, Italian writer, composer and soldier (d. 1612)
- February 10 – Song Ikpil, Korean scholar (d. 1599)
- March 19 – José de Anchieta, Spanish Jesuit missionary in Brazil (d. 1597)
- April 18 – William Harrison, English clergyman (d. 1593)
- June 15 – Henri I de Montmorency, Marshal of France (d. 1614)
- June 23 – Oda Nobunaga, Japanese warlord (d. 1582)
- July 1 – King Frederick II of Denmark (d. 1588)
- July 3 – Myeongjong of Joseon, ruler of Korea (d. 1567)
- July 18 – Zacharius Ursinus, German theologian (d. 1583)
- August 29 – Nicholas Pieck, Dutch Franciscan friar and martyr (d. 1572)
- September 24 – Guru Ram Das, fourth Sikh Guru (d. 1581)
- October 4 – William I, Count of Schwarzburg-Frankenhausen (d. 1597)
- October 18 – Jean Passerat, French writer (d. 1602)
- November 2 – Archduchess Eleanor of Austria (d. 1594)
- November 6 – Joachim Camerarius the Younger, German scientist (d. 1598)
- November 17 – Karl I, Prince of Anhalt-Zerbst, German prince (d. 1561)
- November 26 – Henry Berkeley, 7th Baron Berkeley (d. 1613)
- December 16 – Lucas Osiander the Elder, German pastor (d. 1604)
- December 16 – Hans Bol, Flemish artist (d. 1593)
- date unknown
  - Lodovico Agostini, Italian composer (d. 1590)
  - Isaac Luria, Jewish scholar and mystic (d. 1572)
  - Henry Herbert, 2nd Earl of Pembroke, statesman of the Elizabethan era (d. 1601)
  - Paul Skalić, Croatian encyclopedist, humanist and adventurer (d. 1573)
  - Joan Waste, English Protestant martyr (d. 1556)
  - Lautaro, Mapuche warrior (d. 1557)

1535

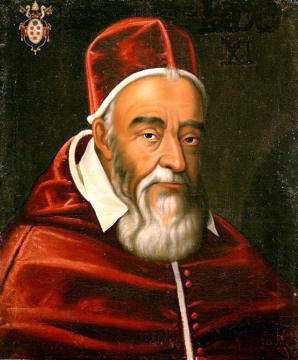
Pope Leo XI

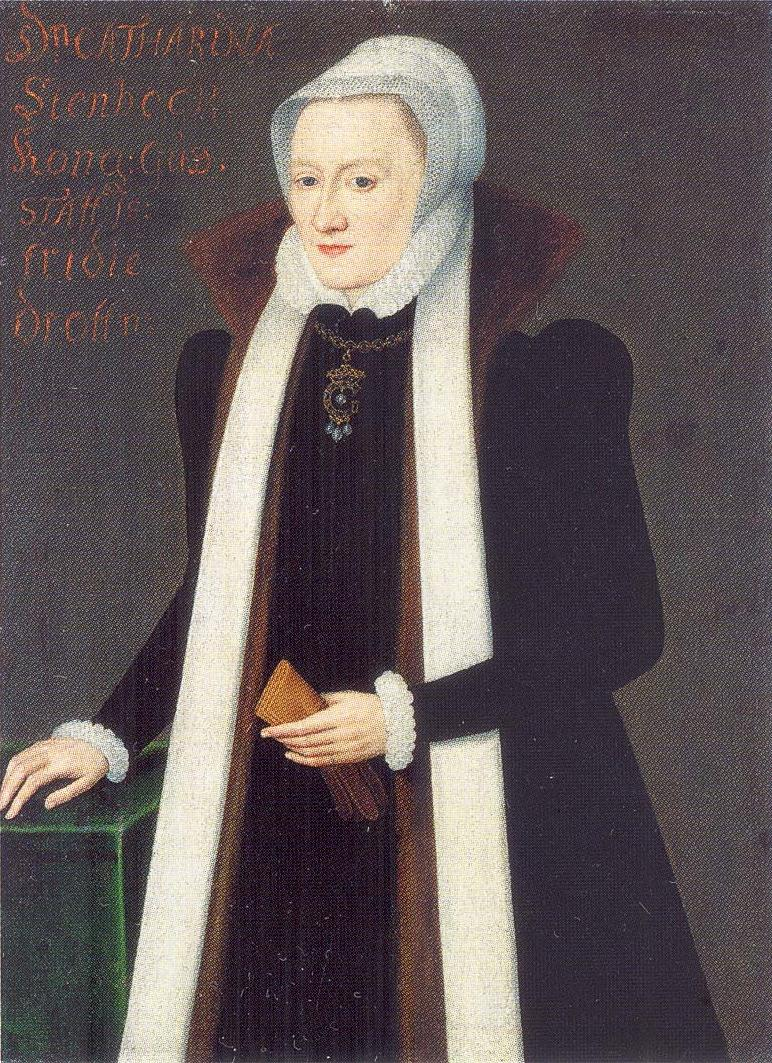
Katarina Stenbock

- February 11 – Pope Gregory XIV (d. 1591)
- January 7 – Edward Stafford, 3rd Baron Stafford, English baron (d. 1603)
- January 16 - Mohamed Thakurufaanu Al-Auzam (d. 1585)
- February 24 – Eléanor de Roucy de Roye, French noble (d. 1564)
- February 27 – Min Phalaung, Burmese monarch (d. 1593)
- February 28 – Cornelius Gemma, Dutch astronomer and astrologer (d. 1578)
- March 10 – William of Rosenberg, High Treasurer and High Burgrave of Bohemia (d. 1592)
- March 23 – Sophie of Brandenburg-Ansbach, princess of Brandenburg-Ansbach (d. 1587)
- May 31 – Alessandro Allori, Italian painter (d. 1607)
- June 2 – Pope Leo XI (d. 1605)
- June 18 – Jakub Krčín, Czech architect (d. 1604)
- June 21 – Leonhard Rauwolf, German physician and botanist (d. 1596)
- June 24 – Joanna of Austria, Princess of Portugal (d. 1573)
- July 4 – William the Younger, Duke of Brunswick-Lüneburg (d. 1592)
- July 21 – García Hurtado de Mendoza, 5th Marquis of Cañete, Royal Governor of Chile (d. 1609)
- July 22 – Katarina Stenbock, queen of Gustav I of Sweden (d. 1621)
- August 21 – Shimazu Yoshihiro, Japanese samurai and warlord (d. 1619)
- September 6 – Emanuel van Meteren, Flemish historian (d. 1612)
- September 18 – Henry Brandon, 2nd Duke of Suffolk (d. 1551)
- October 16 – Niwa Nagahide, Japanese warlord (d. 1585)
- November 9 – Nanda Bayin, King of Burma (d. 1600)
- December 12 – Gilbert Génébrard, Roman Catholic archbishop (d. 1597)
- December 28 – Martin Eisengrein, German theologian (d. 1578)
- date unknown
  - Federico Barocci, Italian painter (d. 1612)
  - Niels Kaas, Danish chancellor (d. 1594)
  - James Melville of Halhill, Scottish historian (d. 1617)
  - Thomas North, English translator (d. c. 1604)
  - Giaches de Wert, Flemish composer (d. 1596)
  - Benedict Pereira, Spanish theologian (d. 1610)

1536

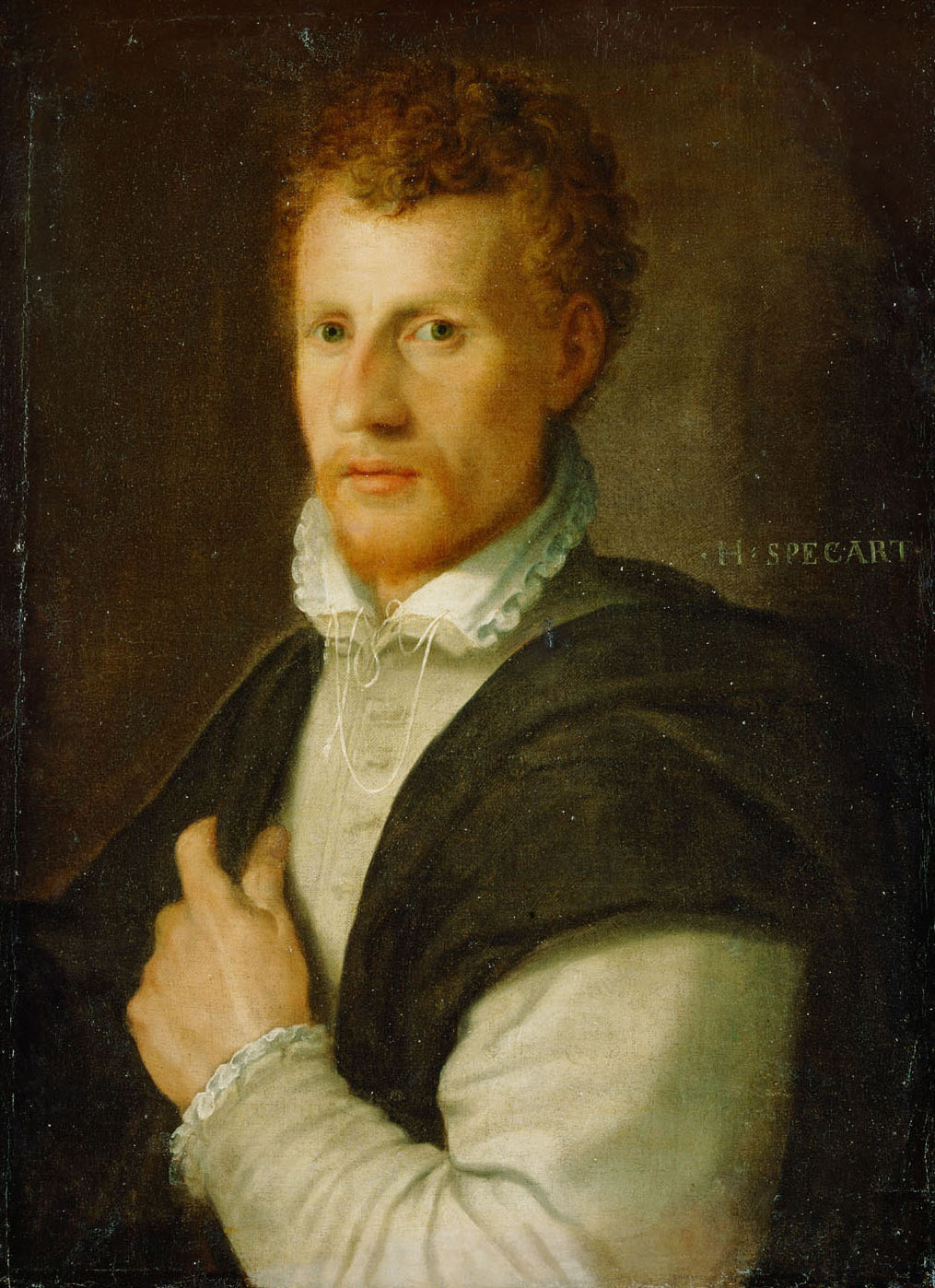
Cornelis Cort

- January 22 – Philibert, Margrave of Baden-Baden (d. 1569)
- February 2
  - Scévole de Sainte-Marthe, French poet (d. 1623)
  - Piotr Skarga, Polish writer (d. 1612)
- February 12 – Leonardo Donato, Doge of Venice (d. 1612)
- February 24 – Pope Clement VIII (d. 1605)
- March 6 – Santi di Tito, Italian painter (d. 1603)
- March 31 – Ashikaga Yoshiteru, Japanese shōgun (d. 1565)
- April 8 – Barbara of Hesse (d. 1597)
- May 3 – Stephan Praetorius, German theologian (d. 1603)
- May 13 – Jacobus Pamelius, Belgian bishop (d. 1587)
- August 10 – Caspar Olevian, German Protestant theologian (d. 1587)
- August 14 – René, Marquis of Elbeuf (d. 1566)
- August 24 – Matthäus Dresser, German humanist, philosopher and historian (d. 1607)
- October 18 – William Lambarde, English antiquarian, writer on legal subjects, politician (d. 1601)
- October 21 – Joachim Ernest, Prince of Anhalt (d. 1586)
- October 28 – Felix Plater, Swiss physician (d. 1614)
- November 11 – Marcantonio Memmo, Doge of Venice (d. 1615)
- November 22 – Johann VI, Count of Nassau-Dillenburg (d. 1606)
- December 26 – Yi I, Korean Confucian scholar (d. 1584)
- December 29 – Henry VI, Burgrave of Plauen (d. 1572)
- date unknown
  - Jeong Cheol, Korean administrator and poet (d. 1593)
  - Leonor de Cisneros, Spanish Protestant (d. 1568)
  - Juan de Fuca, Greek maritime pilot (d. 1602)
  - Charles Howard, 1st Earl of Nottingham, English statesman and admiral (d. 1624)
  - Roger Marbeck, chief physician to Elizabeth I of England (d. 1604)
  - Thomas Sackville, 1st Earl of Dorset, English statesman and poet (d. 1608)
  - Friedrich Sylburg, German classical scholar (d. 1596)
  - Ikeda Tsuneoki, Japanese military commander (d. 1584)
  - Giovanni de' Vecchi, Renaissance painter from Italy (d. 1614)

1537

Willem IV van den Bergh

- January 16 – Albrecht VII, Count of Schwarzburg-Rudolstadt (d. 1605)
- January 21 – Antonio Maria Salviati, Italian Catholic cardinal (d. 1602)
- February 26 – Christopher II, Margrave of Baden-Rodemachern (d. 1575)
- March 4 or January 23 – Longqing Emperor, Emperor of China (d. 1572)
- May 18 – Guido Luca Ferrero, Italian Catholic cardinal (d. 1585)
- May 20 – Hieronymus Fabricius, Italian anatomist (d. 1619)
- May 27 – Louis IV, Landgrave of Hesse-Marburg, son of Landgrave Philip I (d. 1604)
- May 31 – Shah Ismail II of Persia (d. 1577)
- June 3 – João Manuel, Prince of Portugal, Portuguese prince (d. 1554)
- July 20 – Arnaud d'Ossat, French diplomat and writer (d. 1604)
- July 29 – Pedro Téllez-Girón, 1st Duke of Osuna, Spanish duke (d. 1590)
- July 30 – Christopher, Duke of Mecklenburg and administrator of Ratzeburg (d. 1592)
- August 9 – Francesco Barozzi, Italian mathematician (d. 1604)
- August 15 – Shimazu Toshihisa, Japanese samurai (d. 1592)
- October – Lady Jane Grey, claimant to the throne of England (d. 1554)
- October 12 – King Edward VI of England (d. 1553)
- November 21 – Fadrique Álvarez de Toledo, 4th Duke of Alba, Spanish military leader (d. 1583)
- December 5 – Ashikaga Yoshiaki, Japanese shōgun (d. 1597)
- December 20 – King John III of Sweden (d. 1592)
- December 24 – Willem IV van den Bergh, Stadtholder of Guelders and Zutphen (d. 1586)
- December 26 – Albert, Count of Nassau-Weilburg (d. 1593)
- date unknown
  - Jane Lumley, English translator (d. 1578)
  - Shimizu Muneharu, Japanese military commander (d. 1582)
  - John Almond, English Cistercian monk (d. 1585)
  - Jan Krzysztof Tarnowski, Polish noble (d. 1567)
  - Toyotomi Hideyoshi, Japanese warlord (d. 1598)

1538

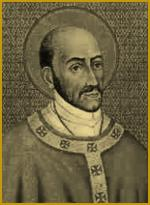
Saint Turibius of Mongrovejo

- January 6 – Jane Dormer, English lady-in-waiting to Mary I (d. 1612)
- January 10 – Louis of Nassau, Dutch general (d. 1574)
- January 13 – Udai Singh of Marwar, Ruler of Marwar (d. 1595)
- January 15 – Maeda Toshiie, Japanese samurai and warlord (d. 1599)
- January 16 – John Frederick III, Duke of Saxony and nominal Duke of Saxe-Gotha (d. 1565)
- February 23 – Dorothy Catherine of Brandenburg-Ansbach (d. 1604)
- March 25 – Christopher Clavius, German mathematician and astronomer (d. 1612)
- April 24 – Guglielmo Gonzaga, Duke of Mantua (d. 1587)
- April 26 – Gian Paolo Lomazzo, Italian painter (d. 1600)
- June 30 – Bonaventura Vulcanius, Flemish Renaissance humanist (d. 1614)
- July 12 – Infanta Maria of Guimarães, Portuguese infanta (d. 1577)
- July 28 – Alberto Bolognetti, Italian Catholic cardinal (d. 1585)
- September 29
  - Count Johan II of East Frisia (d. 1591)
  - Joan Terès i Borrull, Viceroy of Catalonia (d. 1603)
- October 2 – Saint Charles Borromeo, Spanish saint and cardinal of the Roman Catholic Church (d. 1584)
- October 17 – Irene di Spilimbergo, Italian Renaissance poet and painter (d. 1559)
- November 16 – Saint Turibius of Mongrovejo, Spanish Grand Inquisitor, missionary Archbishop of Lima (d. 1606)
- June 12 – Francesco Gonzaga, Spanish Catholic cardinal (d. 1566)
- July 25 – Diane de France, illegitimate daughter of Henry II of France (d. 1619)
- December 8 – Miklós Istvánffy, Hungarian politician (d. 1615)
- December 10 – Giovanni Battista Guarini, Italian poet (d. 1612)
- December 11 – Sigismund of Brandenburg, Archbishop of Magdeburg, Administrator of Halberstadt (d. 1566)
- December 13 – Sigrid Sture, Swedish Governor (d. 1613)
- December 19 – Jan Zborowski, Polish noble (d. 1603)
- December 21 – Luigi d'Este, Italian Catholic cardinal (d. 1586)
- date unknown
  - François de Bar, French scholar (d. 1606)
  - Henry Herbert, 2nd Earl of Pembroke, Welsh-born statesman (d. 1601)
  - Ashikaga Yoshihide, Japanese shōgun (d. 1568)
  - Caesar Baronius, Italian cardinal and historian (d. 1607)
  - Lewis Mordaunt, 3rd Baron Mordaunt, English Member of Parliament (d. 1601)

1539

Franciscus Raphelengius

- January 28 – Nicolò Donato, Doge of Venice (d. 1618)
- February 13 – Elisabeth of Hesse, Electress Palatine by marriage (1576-1582) (d. 1582)
- February 23
  - Henry XI of Legnica, thrice Duke of Legnica (d. 1588)
  - Salima Sultan Begum, Empress of the Mughal Empire as a wife of Emperor Akbar (d. 1613)
- February 27 – Franciscus Raphelengius, Dutch printer (d. 1597)
- March 5 – Christoph Pezel, German theologian (d. 1604)
- March 18 – Maria of Nassau, Countess of Nassau (d. 1599)
- April 5 – George Frederick, Margrave of Brandenburg-Ansbach (d. 1603)
- April 6 – Amalia of Neuenahr, German noble (d. 1602)
- April 7
  - Tobias Stimmer, Swiss artist (d. 1584)
  - Strange Jørgenssøn, Norwegian businessman (d. 1610)
- April 30 – Archduchess Barbara of Austria, Austrian archduchess (d. 1572)
- May 22 – Edward Seymour, 1st Earl of Hertford (d. 1621)
- May 29 – Thomas Pounde, English Jesuit lay brother (d. 1613)
- June 6 – Catherine Vasa, Regent of East Frisia (1599-1610) (d. 1610)
- June 13 – Jost Amman, Swiss printmaker (d. 1591)
- June 23 – William Darrell of Littlecote, English politician (d. 1589)
- July 4 – Louis VI, Elector Palatine (d. 1583)
- September 18 – Louis Gonzaga, Duke of Nevers, Italian-French dignitary and diplomat (d. 1595)
- October 1 – Peter Vok, Czech noble (d. 1611)
- November 1 – Pierre Pithou, French lawyer and scholar (d. 1596)
- December 5 – Fausto Paolo Sozzini, Italian theologian (d. 1604)
- December 20 – Paulus Melissus, German composer (d. 1602)
- December 31 – John Radcliffe, English politician (d. 1568)
- date unknown
  - José Luis Carvajal y de la Cueva, Portuguese explorer (d. 1590)
  - Hasegawa Tōhaku, Japanese painter (d. 1610)
  - Laurence Tomson, English Calvinist (d. 1608)
  - Humphrey Gilbert, English adventurer, explorer, member of Parliament and soldier (d. 1583)

== Deaths ==
1530

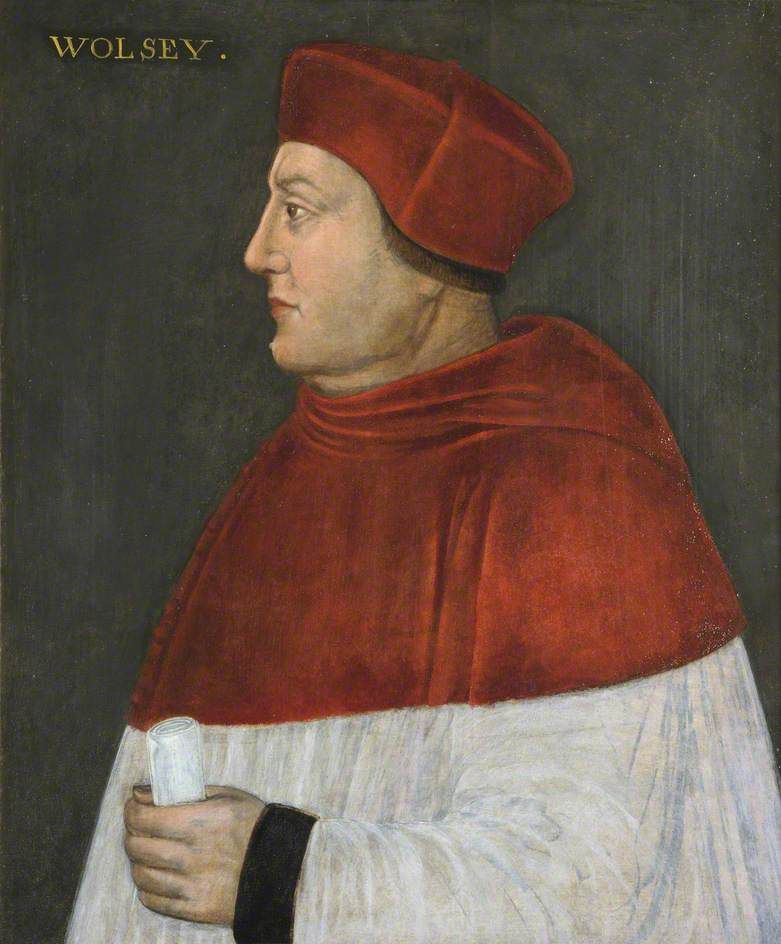
Thomas Wolsey

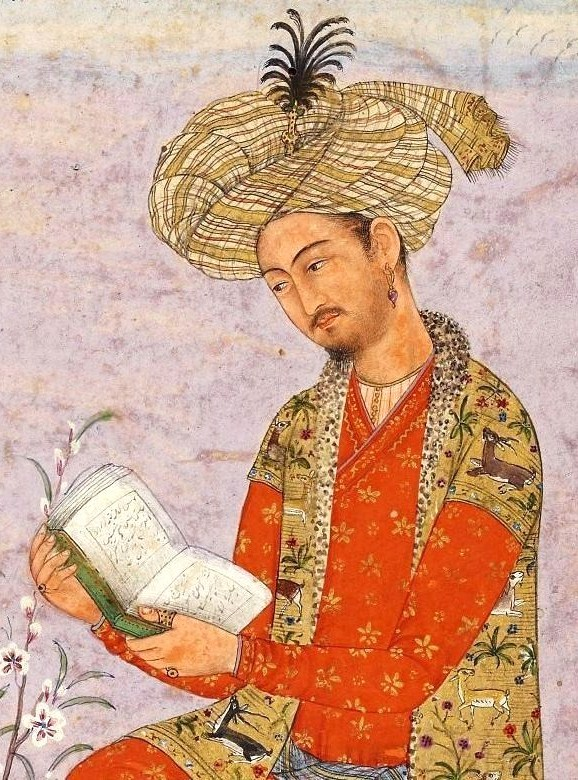
Babur Badshah

- February 7 – Enrique de Cardona y Enríquez, Spanish Catholic cardinal and bishop (b. 1485)
- February 24 – Properzia de' Rossi, Italian Renaissance sculptor (b. c. 1490)
- April 12 – Joanna la Beltraneja, princess of Castile (b. 1462)
- May 3 – Stephen VII Báthory, Hungarian nobleman and military commander
- June 4 – Maximilian Sforza, Duke of Milan (b. 1493)
- June 5 – Mercurino di Gattinara, Italian statesman and jurist (b. 1465)
- June 6 – Boniface IV, Marquess of Montferrat, Italian nobleman (b. 1512)
- June 28 – Margaret of Münsterberg, Duchess consort and regent of Anhalt (b. 1473)
- August 2 – Kanō Masanobu, chief painter of the Ashikaga shogunate (b. 1434)
- August 3 – killed in Battle of Gavinana:
  - Francesco Ferruccio, Florentine captain (b. 1489)
  - Philibert of Chalon, French nobleman (b. 1502)
- August 6 – Jacopo Sannazaro, Italian poet (b. 1458)
- August 10 – Konstanty Ostrogski, Grand Hetman of Lithuania (b. 1460)
- August 28 – Gerold Edlibach, Swiss historian (b. 1454)
- August 29 – Moise of Wallachia
- September 13 – Queen Jeonghyeon, Korean royal consort (b. 1462)
- September 15 – Maria Paleologa, Italian noblewoman (b. 1508)
- October 10 – Thomas Grey, 2nd Marquess of Dorset, English noble (b. 1477)
- November 24 – Mingyi Nyo, founder of the Toungoo Dynasty of Burma (Myanmar) (b. 1459)
- November 29 – Cardinal Thomas Wolsey, British statesman (b. c. 1473)
- December 1 – Margaret of Austria, Regent of the Netherlands (b. 1480)
- December 22 – Willibald Pirckheimer, German humanist (b. 1470)
- December 26 – Babur, founder of the Mughal Empire (b. 1483)
- date unknown
  - Quentin Matsys, Flemish painter (b. 1466)
  - Estienne de La Roche, French mathematician (b. 1470)
  - Søren Norby, Danish naval commander
  - Andrea del Sarto, Italian painter (b. 1487)

1531

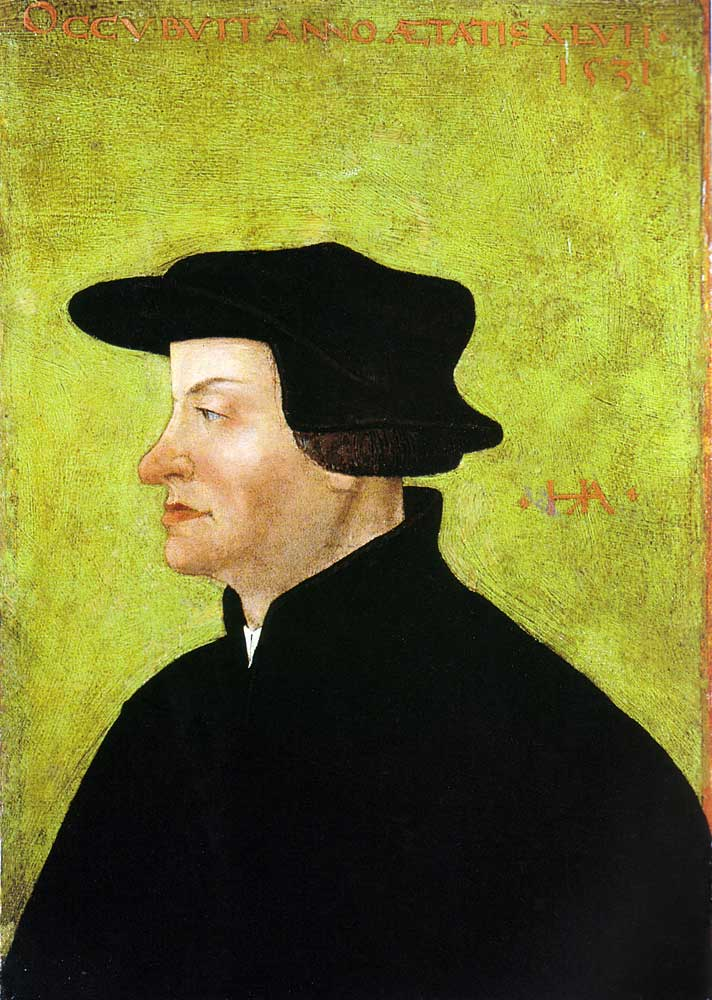
Huldrych Zwingli

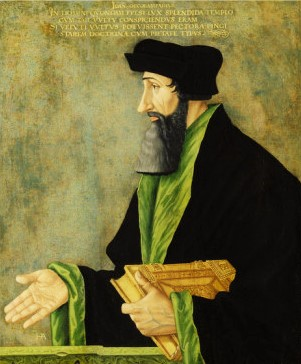
Johannes Oecolampadius

- January 14 – Walraven II van Brederode, Dutch noble (b. 1462)
- January 31 – Edward Sutton, 2nd Baron Dudley (b. 1460)
- February 16 – Johannes Stöffler, German mathematician (b. 1452)
- March – María Pacheco, Spanish heroine and defender of Toledo (b. 1496)
- March 6 – Pedrarias Dávila, Spanish colonial administrator (b. c. 1440)
- May 19 – Jan Łaski, Polish statesman and diplomat (b. 1456)
- May 20 – Guy XVI, Count of Laval (b. 1476)
- May 10 – George I, Duke of Pomerania from the House of Griffins (b. 1493)
- July 7 – Tilman Riemenschneider, German sculptor (b. 1460)
- July 17 – Hosokawa Takakuni, Japanese military commander (b. 1484)
- July 23 – Louis de Brézé, seigneur d'Anet, Marshal of Normandy and husband of Diane de Poitiers
- August 30 – Diego Hurtado de Mendoza, 3rd Duke of the Infantado, Spanish noble (b. 1461)
- September 18 – Lorenzo Pucci, Italian Catholic cardinal (b. 1458)
- September 22 – Louise of Savoy, French regent (b. 1476)
- October 11 – Huldrych Zwingli, Swiss reformer (in battle) (b. 1484)
- November 24 – Johannes Oecolampadius, German religious reformer (b. 1482)
- November 28 – Hedwig of Münsterberg-Oels, German noble (b. 1508)
- December 1 – Maud Green, English noble (b. 1492)
- date unknown
  - Henrique of Kongo, bishop (b. 1495)
  - Eva von Isenburg, sovereign Princess Abbess of Thorn Abbey
  - Bars Bolud Jinong, Mongol khan (b. 1490)
  - Vallabha Acharya, Indian founder of the Hindu Vallabha sect (b. 1479)
  - Gerónimo de Aguilar, Spanish Franciscan friar who participated in the Spanish conquest of Mexico (b. 1489)
- probable
  - Fernán Pérez de Oliva, Spanish man of letters (b. 1492)
  - Antonio Pigafetta, Italian navigator (b. 1491)

1532

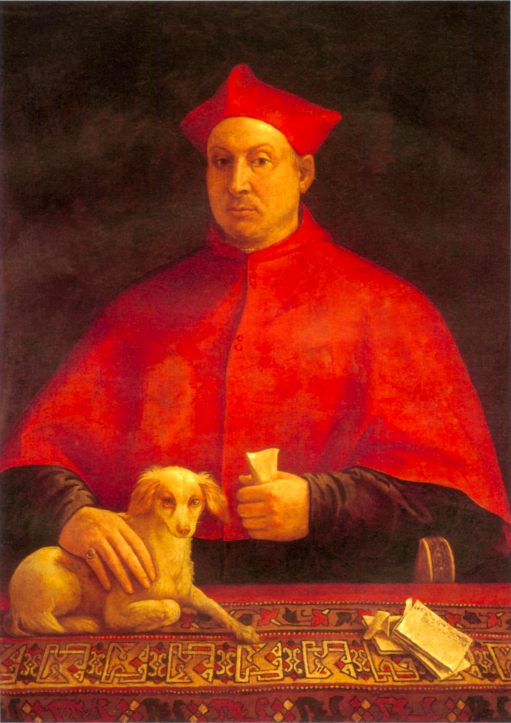
Cardinal Pompeo Colonna

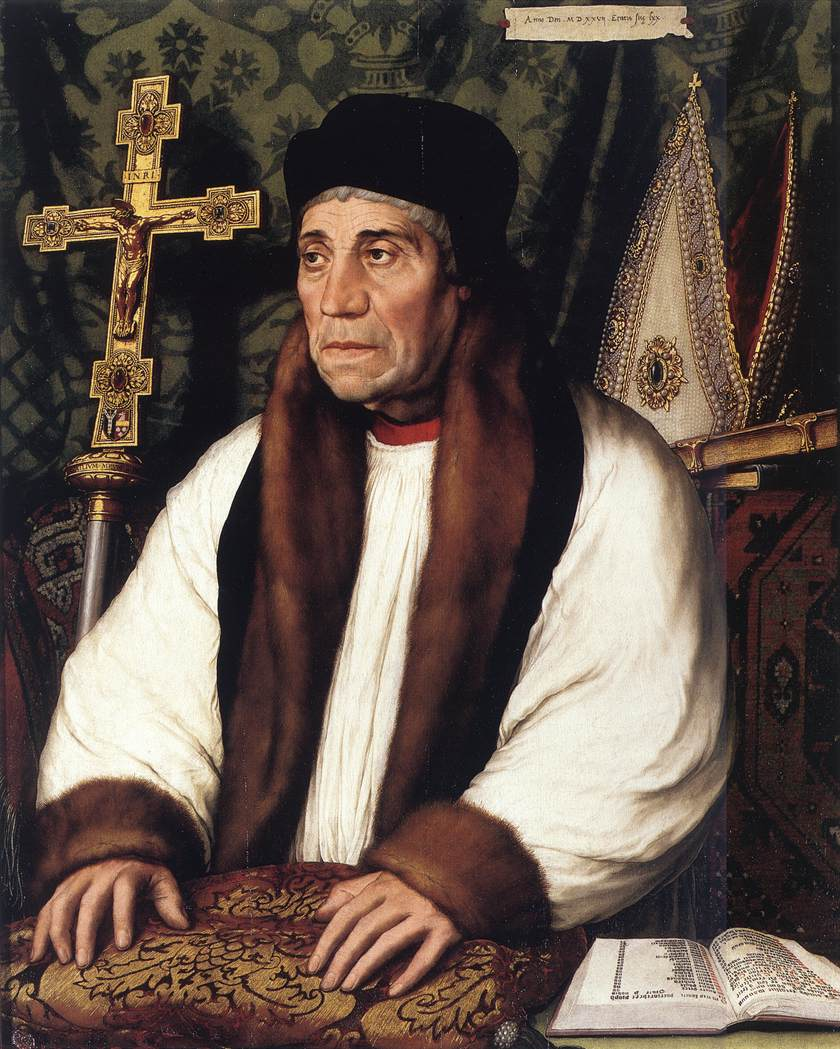
Reverend William Warham

- May – Elizabeth Stafford, Countess of Sussex
- June – Bernardino Luini, Italian painter (b. 1482)
- June 28 – Pompeo Colonna, Italian Roman Catholic cardinal (b. 1479)
- July 8 – Andrea Riccio, Italian sculptor and architect (b. 1470)
- August 11 – John of Denmark, Danish prince (b. 1518)
- August 16 – John, Elector of Saxony (b. 1468)
- August 19 – Caritas Pirckheimer, German nun (b. 1467)
- August 22 – William Warham, Archbishop of Canterbury (b. 1450)
- September – Vlad VI Înecatul, Prince of Wallachia
- October 1 – Jan Mabuse, Flemish painter
- December 2 – Louis Gonzaga (Rodomonte), Italian-French dignitary and diplomat (b. 1500)
- December 3 – Louis II, Count Palatine of Zweibrücken, Duke of Zweibrücken from 1514 to 1532 (b. 1502)
- December 12 – Pietro Accolti, Italian Catholic cardinal (b. 1455)
- December 13 – Solomon Molcho, Portuguese mystic (b. 1500)
- December 30 – Krzysztof Szydłowiecki, Polish noble (b. 1467)
- date unknown
  - Jeanne de la Font, French poet and culture patron (b. 1500)
  - Huáscar, 12th Inca Emperor

1533

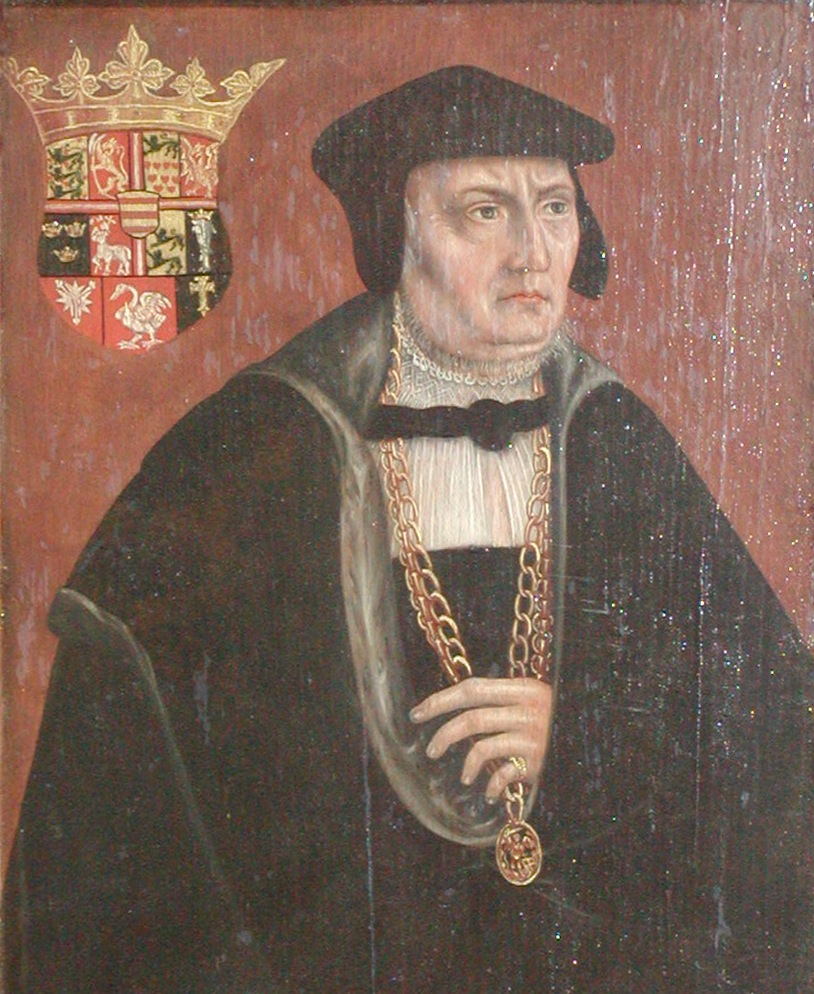
King Frederick I of Denmark

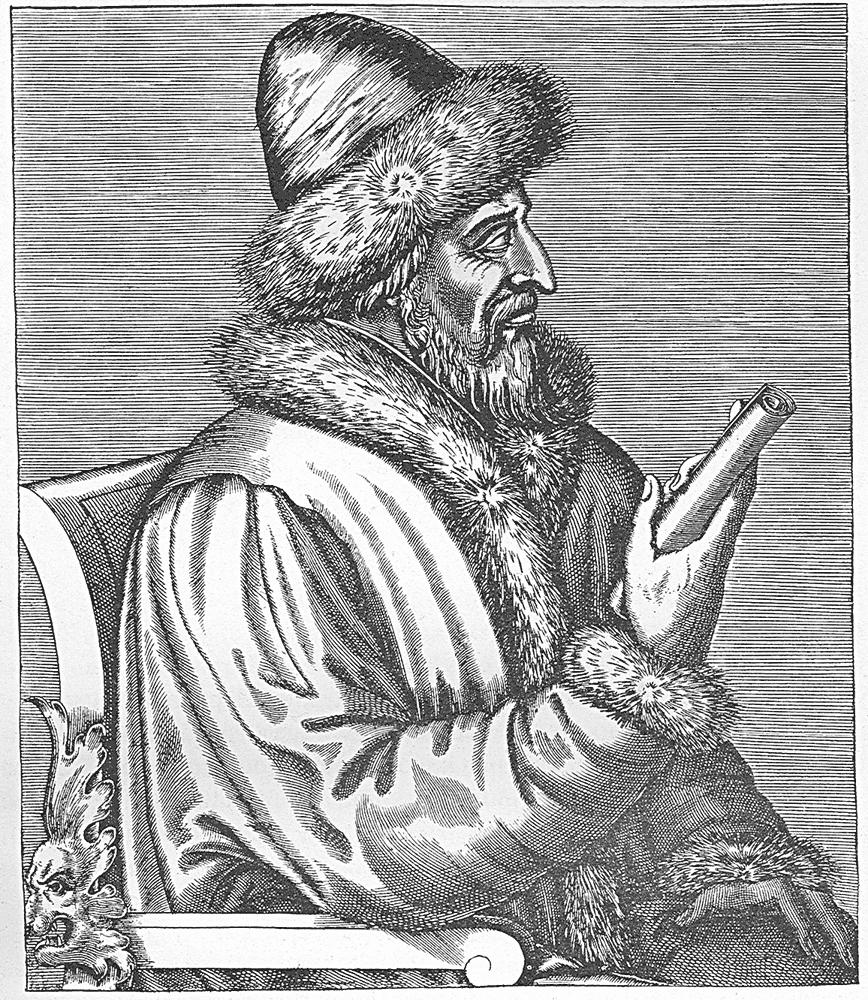
Grand Prince Vasili III of Muscovy

- March 16 – John Bourchier, 2nd Baron Berners, English soldier and statesman (b. 1467)
- April 10 – King Frederick I of Denmark (b. 1471)
- April 28 – Nicholas West, English bishop and diplomat (b. 1461)
- April 30 – John George, Marquis of Montferrat, Italian noble (b. 1488)
- June 25 – Mary Tudor, queen of Louis XII of France (b. 1496)
- July 4 – John Frith, English Protestant priest and martyr (b. 1503)
- July 6 – Ludovico Ariosto, Italian poet (b. 1474)
- July 26 – Atahualpa, last Inca ruler of Peru (executed) (b. c.1502)
- September 6 – Jacopo Salviati, Italian politician and son-in-law of Lorenzo de' Medici (b. 1461)
- September 17 – Philip I, Margrave of Baden (b. 1479)
- September 20 – Veit Stoss, German sculptor (b. c. 1447)
- October 10 – Severinus of Saxony, Prince of Saxony; died young (b. 1522)
- October – Túpac Huallpa, puppet ruler of Peru
- December 3 – Grand Prince Vasili III of Muscovy (b. 1479)
- date unknown
  - Alauddin Firuz Shah II, sultan of Bengal
  - Duarte Pacheco Pereira, Portuguese explorer (b. c. 1460)
  - Anne Rud, Danish noble and defender
  - Fortún Ximénez, Spanish sailor and mutineer
  - Bayin Htwe, king of Prome in Burma
  - Lucas van Leyden, Dutch artist (b. 1494)
- probable – Girolamo del Pacchia, Italian painter (b. 1477)

1534

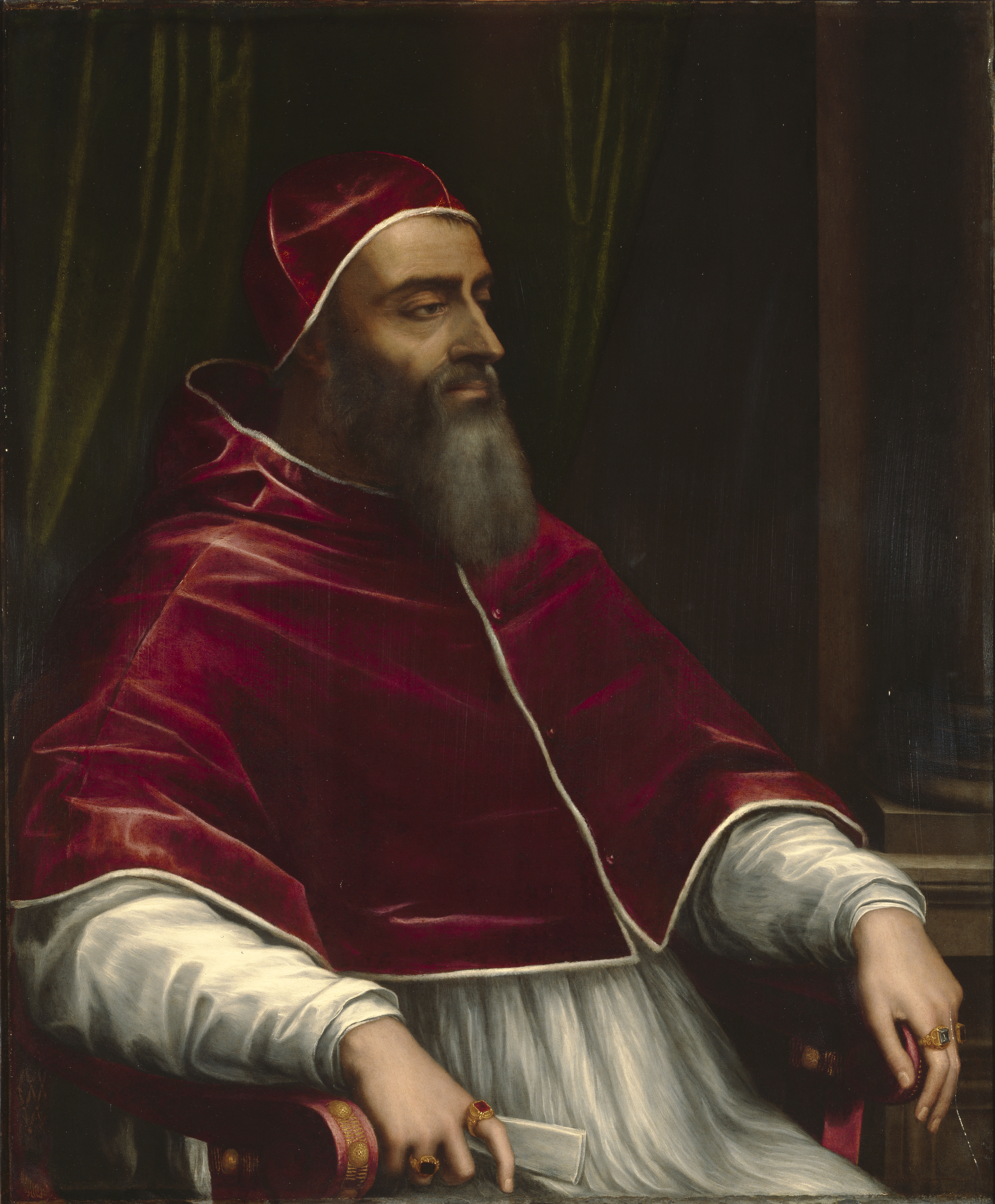
Pope Clement VII

- January 9 – Johannes Aventinus, Bavarian historian and philologist (b. 1477)
- January 25 – Magdalena of Saxony (b. 1507)
- February 15 – Barbara Jagiellon, duchess consort of Saxony and Margravine consort of Meissen (1500–1534) (b. 1478)
- March 5 – Antonio da Correggio, Italian painter (b. 1489)
- March 17 – Vojtěch I of Pernstein, Bohemian nobleman (b. 1490)
- March 19 – Michael Weiße, German theologian (b. c. 1488)
- April 5 – Jan Matthys, German Anabaptist reformer
- April 20 – Elizabeth Barton, English prophet and nun (executed) (b. 1506)
- May 3 – Juana de la Cruz Vázquez Gutiérrez, Spanish abbess of the Franciscan Third Order Regular (b. 1481)
- June 14 – Chaitanya Mahaprabhu, Bengali mystic (b. 1486)
- June 27 – Hille Feicken, Dutch Anabaptist
- August 3 – Andrea della Valle, Italian Catholic cardinal (b. 1463)
- August 9 – Thomas Cajetan, Italian theologian and cardinal (b. 1470)
- August 21 – Philippe Villiers de L'Isle-Adam, 44th Grandmaster of the Knights Hospitaller (b. 1464)
- September 7 – Lazarus Spengler, German hymnwriter (b. 1479)
- September 24 – Michael Glinski, Lithuanian prince (b. c. 1470)
- September 25 – Pope Clement VII (b. 1478)
- October 31 – Alfonso I d'Este, Duke of Ferrara (b. 1476)
- November 7 – Ferdinand of Portugal, Duke of Guarda and Trancoso, Portuguese nobleman (b. 1507)
- November 8 – William Blount, 4th Baron Mountjoy, scholar and patron (b. c. 1478)
- November 23 – Beatriz Galindo, Spanish Latinist and scholar (b. 1465)
- December 9 – Balthasar of Hanau-Münzenberg, German nobleman (b. 1508)
- December 27 – Antonio da Sangallo the Elder, Florentine architect (b. 1453)
- date unknown
  - István Báthory, Hungarian noble (b. 1477)
  - Edward Guildford, Lord Warden of the Cinque Ports (b. 1474)
  - Cesare Hercolani, Italian soldier, murdered (b. 1499)
  - Humphrey Kynaston, English highwayman (b. 1474)
  - Amago Okihisa, Japanese nobleman (b. 1497)
  - John Taylor, English Master of the Rolls (b. 1480)

1535

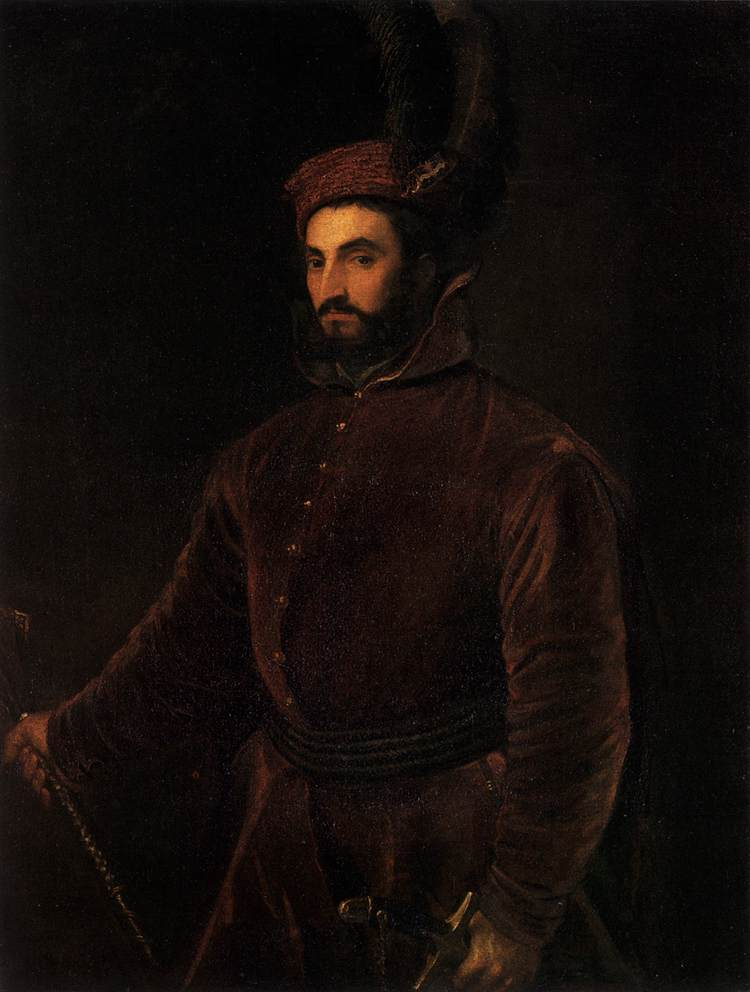
Ippolito de' Medici

- February 18 – Heinrich Cornelius Agrippa, German alchemist and occult writer (b. 1486)
- February 28 – Wolter von Plettenberg, Master of the Livonian Order (b. 1450)
- April 4 – Beatrix of Baden, Margravine of Baden, Countess Palatine consort of Simmern (b. 1492)
- May 4 (executed by Henry VIII of England):
  - Saint John Houghton, Carthusian monk
  - Saint Robert Lawrence, Carthusian monk
  - Saint Augustine Webster, Prior of the London Charterhouse
  - Saint Richard Reynolds, Bridgettine monk of Syon
- May 26 – Francesco Berni, Italian poet (b. 1497)
- June 12 – Elisabeth Wandscherer, Dutch Anabaptist
- June 19 – Sebastian Newdigate, Carthusian monk and martyr (b. 1500)
- June 22 – John Fisher, Bishop of Rochester (executed) (b. c. 1469)
- July 6 – Sir Thomas More, English lawyer, writer, and politician (executed) (b. 1478)
- July 11 – Joachim I Nestor, Elector of Brandenburg (b. 1484)
- August 10 – Ippolito de' Medici, ruler of Florence (poisoned) (b. 1509)
- September – George Nevill, 5th Baron Bergavenny (b. 1469)
- September 23 – Catherine of Saxe-Lauenburg, queen of Gustav I of Sweden (b. 1513)
- November 17 – Piero de Ponte, 45th Grandmaster of the Knights Hospitaller (b. 1462)
- December 29 – Matsudaira Kiyoyasu, Japanese daimyo (b. 1511)
- December 31 – William Skeffington, Lord Deputy of Ireland (b. 1465)
- date unknown
  - Jodocus Badius, Flemish pioneer of printing (b. 1462)
  - Canghali of Kazan, khan of Qasim and Kazan (b. 1516)
  - Bartolomeo Tromboncino, Italian composer (b. 1470)
  - Feliks Zamoyski, Polish noble

1536

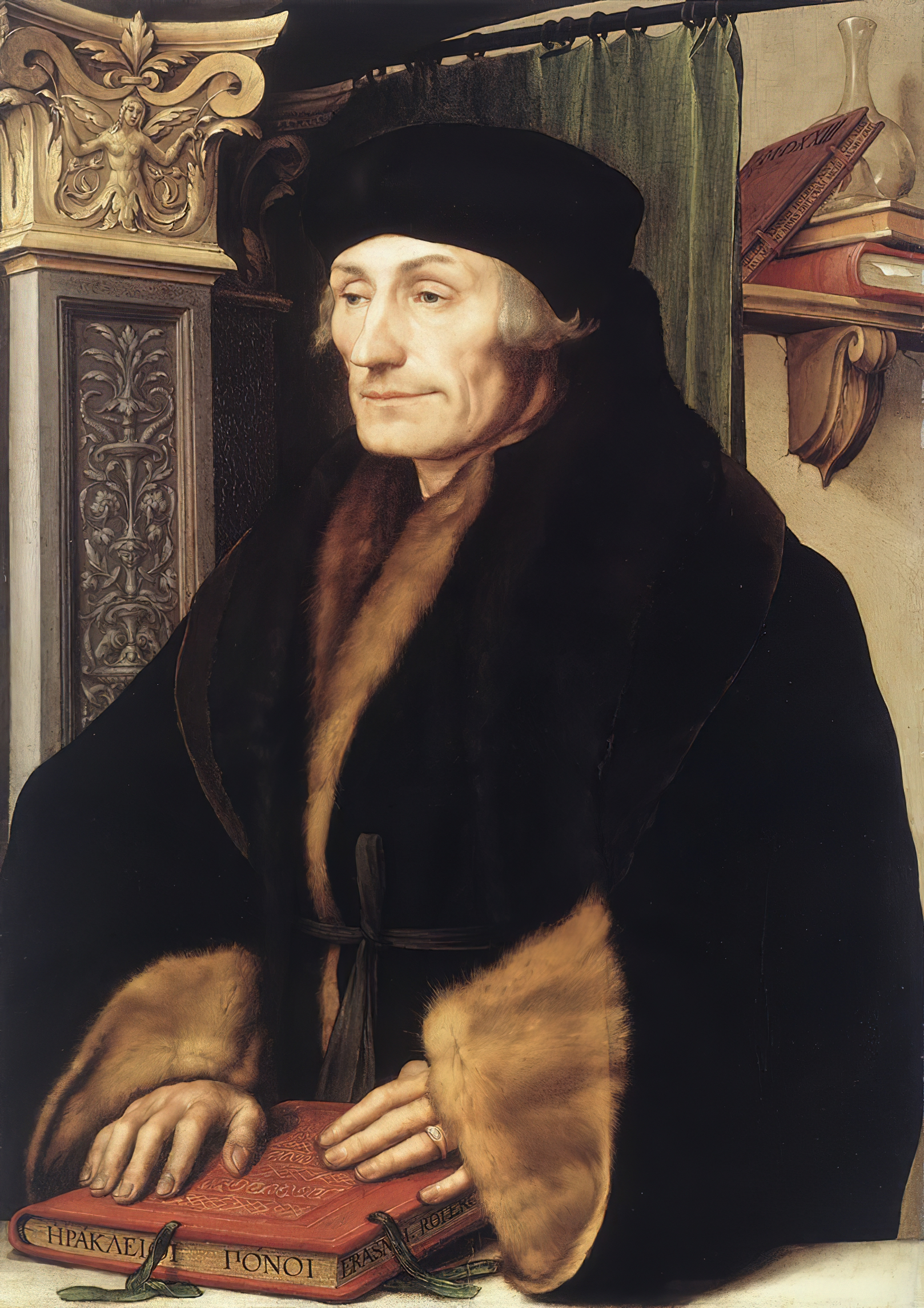
Erasmus

- January 6 – Baldassare Peruzzi, Italian architect and painter (b. 1481)
- January 7 – Catherine of Aragon, First Queen of Henry VIII of England (b. 1485)
- January 22
  - John of Leiden, Anabaptist leader from the Dutch city of Leiden (b. 1509)
  - Bernhard Knipperdolling, German religious leader (b. c. 1495)
- February 25
  - Berchtold Haller, German-born reformer (b. 1492)
  - Jacob Hutter, Tyrolean founder of the Hutterite religious movement (burned at the stake)
- March 15 – Pargalı Ibrahim Pasha, Ottoman grand vizier (b. 1493)
- April 4 – Frederick I, Margrave of Brandenburg-Ansbach (b. 1460)
- May 17 – George Boleyn, 2nd Viscount Rochford, English diplomat (executed, with four other men accused of adultery with the queen) (b. 1503)
- May 19 – Anne Boleyn, second queen of Henry VIII of England (executed) (b. c. 1501/1507)
- May 31 – Charles I, Duke of Münsterberg-Oels, Count of Kladsko, Governor of Bohemia and Silesia (b. 1476)
- June 29 – Bernhard III, Margrave of Baden-Baden (b. 1474)
- July 11 or July 12 – Erasmus, Dutch philosopher (b. 1466)
- July 23 – Henry FitzRoy, 1st Duke of Richmond and Somerset, illegitimate son of Henry VIII of England (b. 1519)
- June 28 – Richard Pace, English diplomat (b. 1482)
- August 10 – Francis III, Duke of Brittany, Dauphin of France, brother of Henry II (b. 1518)
- September 25 – Johannes Secundus, Dutch poet (b. 1511)
- September 26 – Didier de Saint-Jaille, 46th Grandmaster of the Knights Hospitaller
- September 27 – Felice della Rovere, also known as Madonna Felice, was the illegitimate daughter of Pope Julius II (b. 1483)
- October 6 – William Tyndale, English Protestant Bible translator (b. c. 1494)
- October 14 – Garcilaso de la Vega, Spanish poet (b. 1503)
- December 21 – Sir John Seymour, English courtier (b. 1474)
- date unknown
  - Hector Boece, Scottish philosopher (b. 1465)
  - Cecilia Gallerani, principal mistress of Ludovico Sforza, Duke of Milan (b. 1473)
  - Hiraga Genshin, Japanese retainer and samurai
  - Guru Jambheshwar was the founder of the Bishnoi Panth(b. 1451)
  - John Rastell, English printer and author
  - Jacques Lefèvre d'Étaples, French theologian and humanist (b. c. 1450)

1537

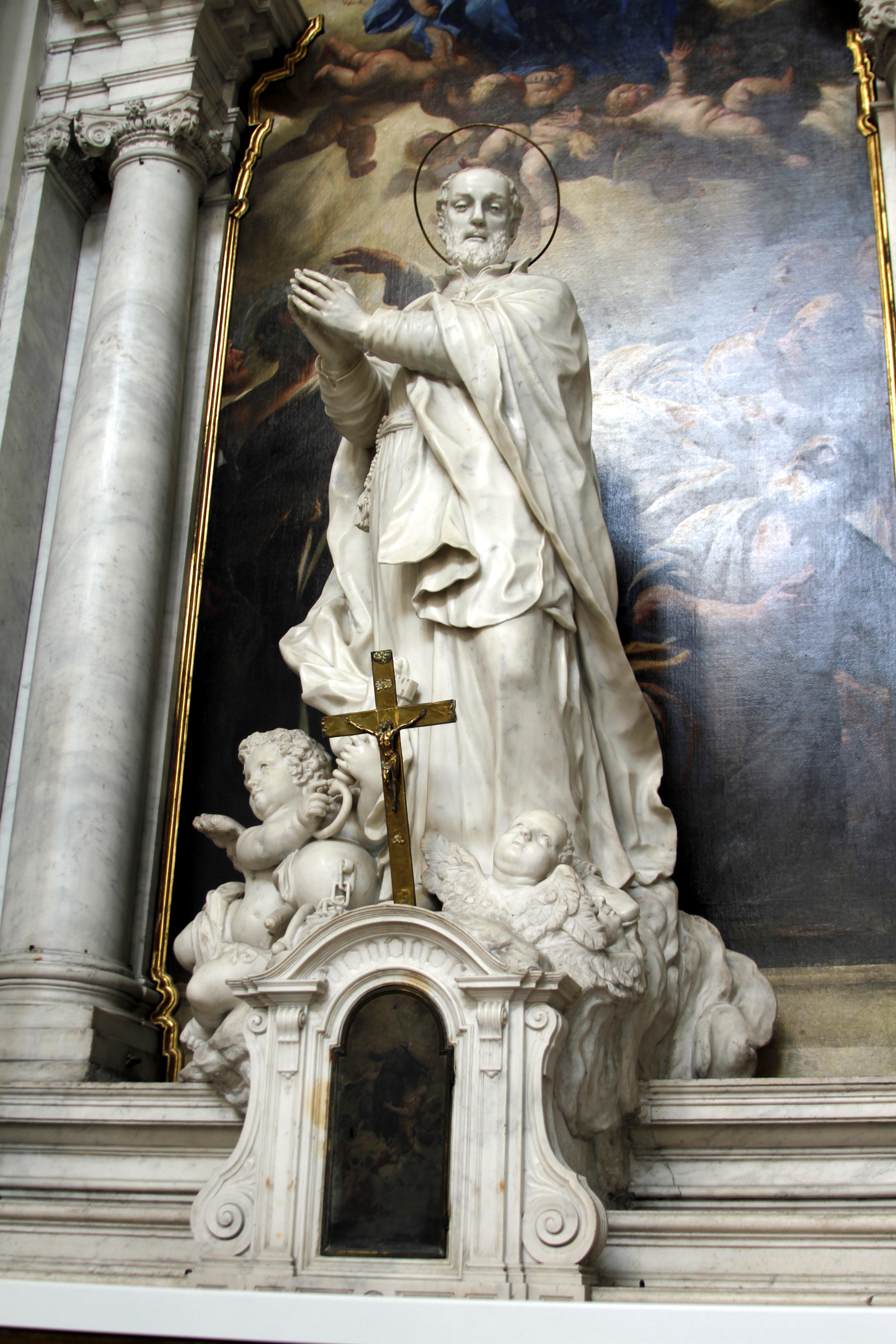
Saint Gerolamo Emiliani

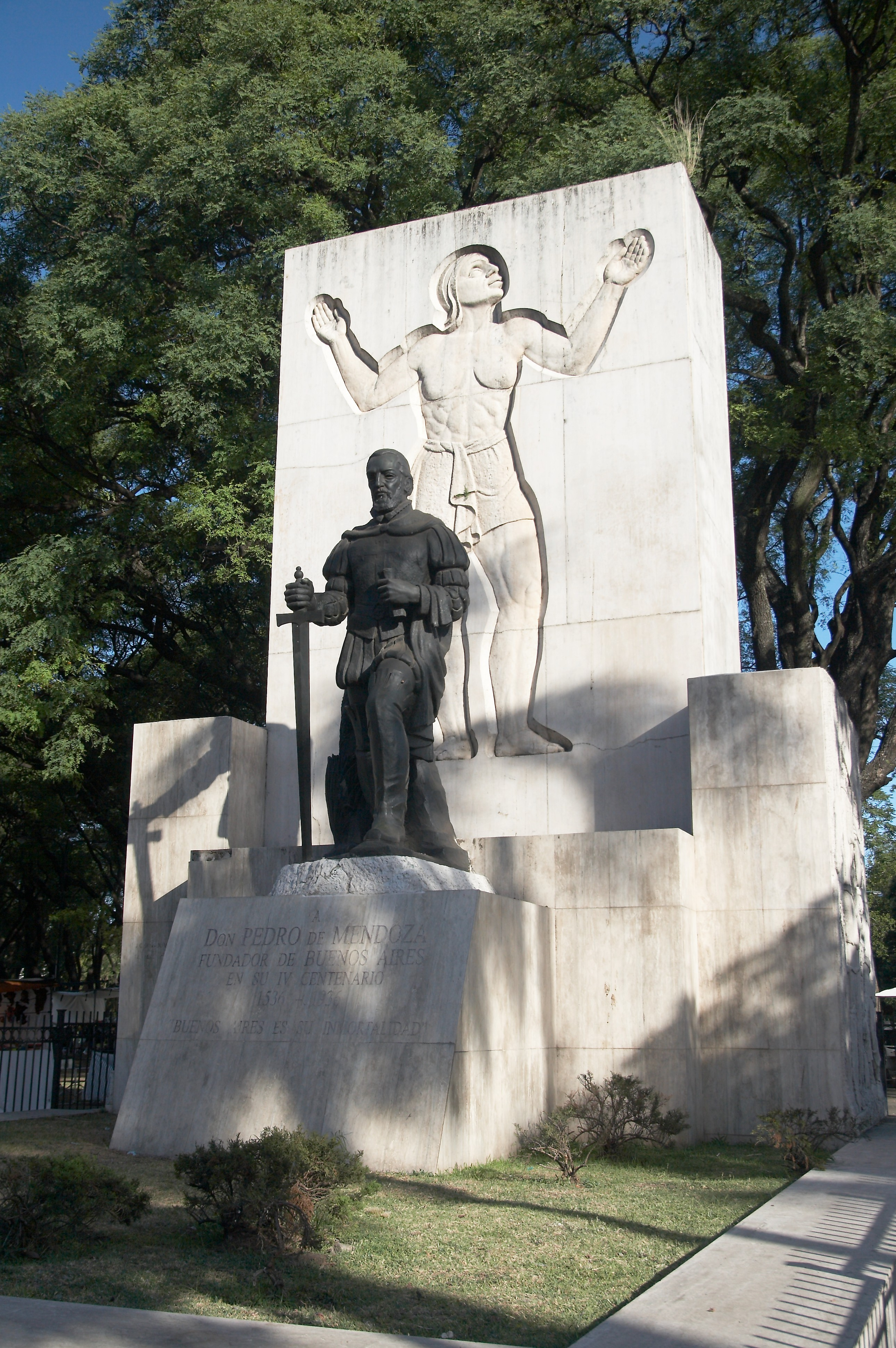
Pedro de Mendoza

- January 6
  - Alessandro de' Medici, Duke of Florence (b. 1510)
  - Baldassare Peruzzi, Italian architect and painter (b. 1481)
- January 12 – Lorenzo di Credi, Florentine painter and sculptor (b. 1459)
- February 2 – Johann Carion, German astrologer and chronicler (b. 1499)
- February 3 – Thomas FitzGerald, 10th Earl of Kildare, Anglo-Irish noble, rebel (executed) (b. 1513)
- February 8
  - Otto von Pack, German conspirator (b. c. 1480)
  - Saint Gerolamo Emiliani, Italian humanitarian (b. 1481)
- January 11 – John, Hereditary Prince of Saxony, German prince (b. 1498)
- March 25 – Charles, Duke of Vendôme, French noble (b. 1489)
- March 28 – Francesco of Saluzzo, Marquess of Saluzzo (b. 1498)
- May 10 – Andrzej Krzycki, Polish archbishop (b. 1482)
- May 24 – Sophie of Brandenburg-Ansbach-Kulmbach, German princess (b. 1485)
- June 2
  - Francis Bigod, English noble, rebel (b. 1507)
  - Thomas Percy, English rebel (b 1504)
  - Adam Sedbar, English abbot and rebel (b. 1502)
- June 23 – Pedro de Mendoza, Spanish conquistador (b. 1487)
- June 29 – Henry Percy, 6th Earl of Northumberland, English noble (b. 1502)
- July 7 – Madeleine of Valois, queen of James V of Scotland (b. 1520)
- July 12 – Robert Aske, English lawyer, rebel (executed) (b. 1500)
- September 4 – Johann Dietenberger, German theologian (b. c. 1475)
- September 7 – Nikolaus von Schönberg, German Catholic cardinal (b. 1472)
- September 20 – Pavle Bakić, last Serb Despot and medieval Serb monarch
- September 25 – William Framyngham, English author
- October 24 – Jane Seymour, 3rd queen consort of Henry VIII of England (complications of childbirth) (b. c. 1508)
- October 29 – Elizabeth Lucar, English calligrapher (b. 1510)
- December 10 or December 11 – Andrey of Staritsa, son of Ivan III of Russia the Great (b. 1490)
- date unknown – John Kite, Archbishop of Armagh and Bishop of Carlisle
- probable – Thomas Murner, German satirist (b. 1475)

1538

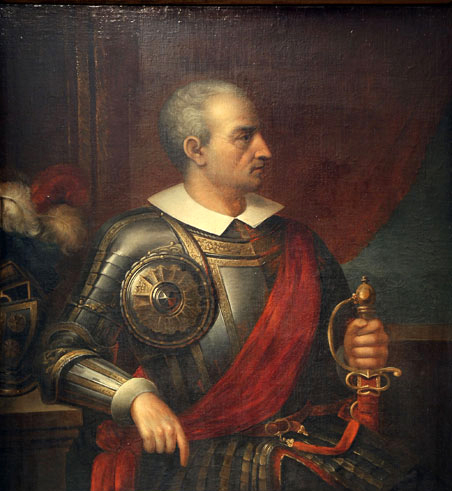
Diego de Almagro

- January 8 – Beatrice of Portugal, Duchess of Savoy (b. 1504)
- February 3 – John III of the Palatinate, Administrator of the Bishopric of Regensburg (b. 1488)
- February 7 – Olav Engelbrektsson, Archbishop of Norway (born c. 1480).
- February 12 – Albrecht Altdorfer, German painter (b. c. 1480)
- March 18 – Érard de La Marck, prince-bishop of Liège (b. 1472)
- April 3 – Elizabeth Boleyn, Countess of Wiltshire (b. 1480)
- April 4 – Elena Glinskaya, Regent of Russia (b. c. 1510)
- May 8 – Edward Foxe, English churchman (b. 1496)
- May 15 – Philipp III, Count of Hanau-Lichtenberg (b. 1482)
- May 22 – John Forest, English Franciscan friar (martyred) (b. 1471)
- June 22 – Bodo VIII, Count of Stolberg-Wernigerode (1511–1538) (b. 1467)
- June 30 – Charles II, Duke of Guelders (b. 1467)
- July 8 – Diego de Almagro, Spanish conquistador (b. 1475)
- September 14 – Henry III of Nassau-Breda, Baron of Breda (b. 1483)
- September 28 – Mary of Bourbon, daughter of Charles, Duke of Vendôme (b. 1515)
- October 20 – Francesco Maria I della Rovere, Duke of Urbino, condottiero (b. 1490)
- November 22 – John Lambert, English Protestant martyr (burned at stake)
- December 28 – Andrea Gritti, Doge of Venice (b. 1455)
- date unknown
  - Pierre Gringoire, French poet and playwright (b. 1475)
  - Isabella Hoppringle, Scottish abbess and spy (b. 1460)
  - Paganino Paganini, Italian publisher (b. c. 1450)

1539

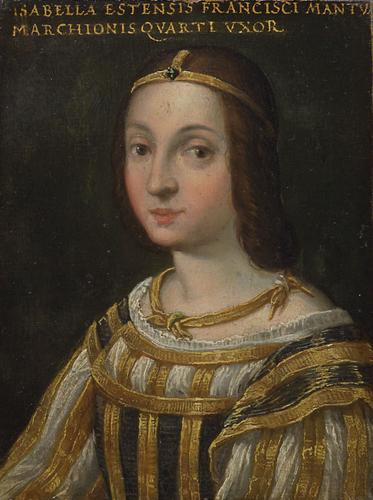
Isabella d'Este

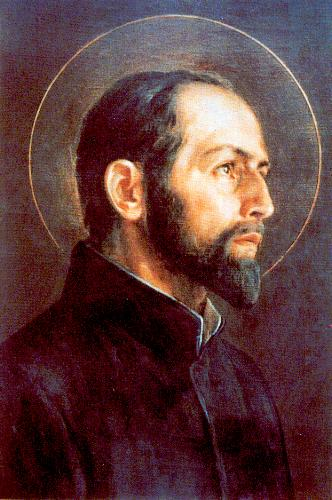
Saint Anthony Maria Zaccaria

- January 24 – Anneke Esaiasdochter, Dutch Anabaptist writer (b. 1509)
- February – Narapati of Prome, king of Prome in Burma.
- February 6 – John III, Duke of Cleves (b. 1491)
- February 13 – Isabella d'Este, Marquise of Mantua (b. 1474)
- March 5 – Nuno da Cunha, Portuguese governor in India (b. 1487)
- March 12 – Thomas Boleyn, 1st Earl of Wiltshire, English diplomat and politician (b.1477)
- March 19 – Lord Edmund Howard, English nobleman (b. c. 1478))
- April 17 – George, Duke of Saxony (b. 1471)
- April 19 – Katarzyna Weiglowa, Jewish martyr (b. 1460)
- April 30 – John Bourchier, 1st Earl of Bath, English noble (b. 1470)
- May 1 – Isabella of Portugal, Holy Roman Empress (b. 1503)
- May 7 – Ottaviano Petrucci, Italian printer (b. 1466)
- May 7 or September 22 – Guru Nanak, founder of Sikhism (b. 1469)
- June 20 – Philip III, Count of Waldeck-Eisenberg (1524–1539) (b. 1486)
- July 5 – St Anthony Maria Zaccaria, Italian saint (b. 1502)
- July 9 – Adrian Fortescue, English Roman Catholic martyr (b. 1476)
- August – Vannoccio Biringuccio, Italian metallurgist (b. 1480)
- September 8 – John Stokesley, English prelate (b. 1475)
- November 14 – Hugh Cook Faringdon, English Abbot of Reading
- December 12 – Bartolomeo degli Organi, Italian musician (b. 1474)
- December 20 – Johannes Lupi, Flemish composer (b. c. 1506)
- date unknown
  - James Beaton, Scottish church leader (b. 1473)
  - Cura Ocllo, Inca queen
