= 15th century in Norway =

- Other decades
- 13th | 14th | 15th | 16th | 17th

Events from the 15th century in Norway.

== 1410s ==
1412

- 28 October – Death of Margaret Valdemarsdatter, queen (born 1353).

== 1420s ==
1426

- The Kalmar War with the Hanseatic League starts.

1429

- Sacking of Bergen by the Victual Brothers.

== 1430s ==
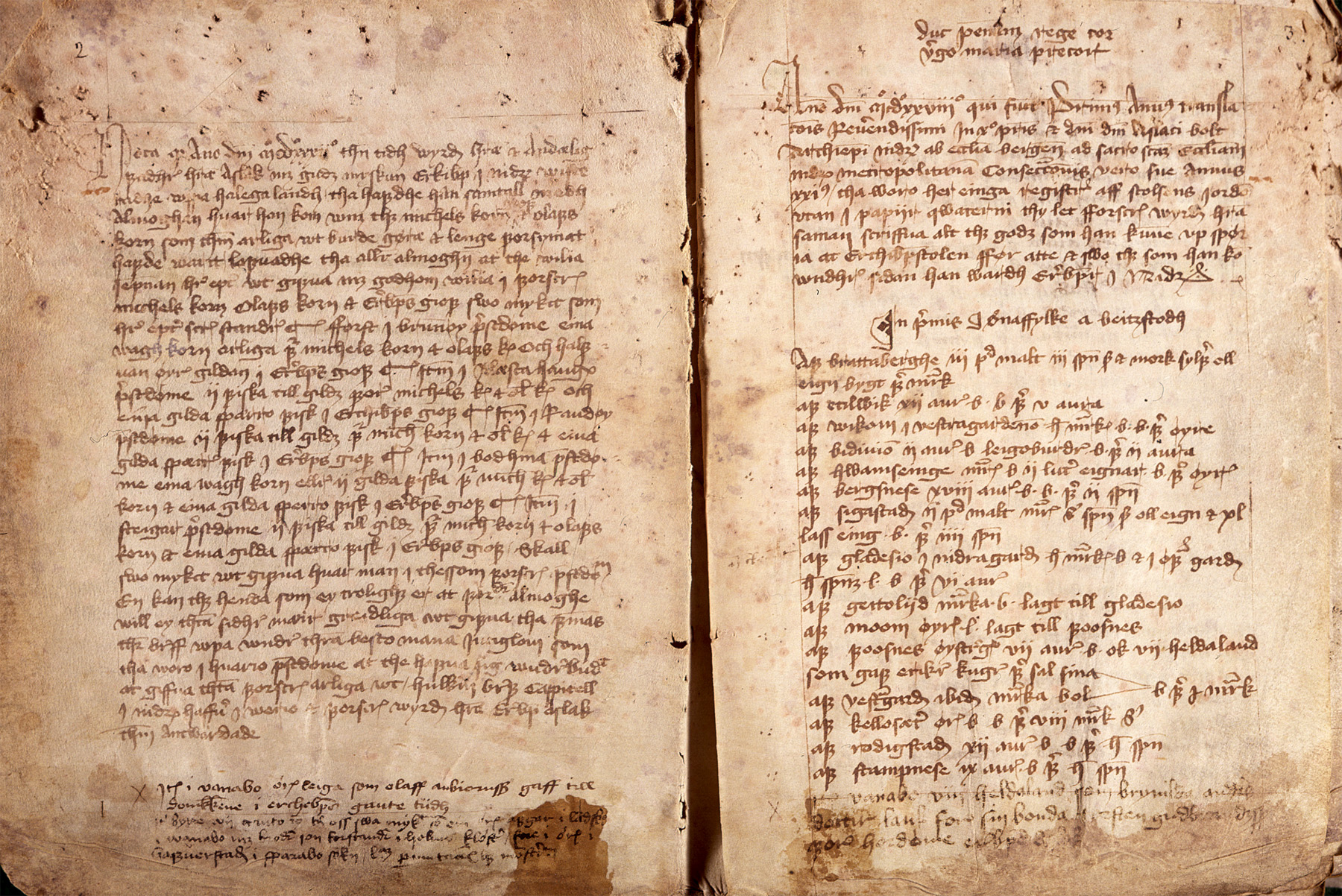
Aslak Bolt's cadastre

1432

- January – Pietro Querini and his crew are shipwrecked at Røst.
- Aslak Bolt's cadastre, cadastre of the Archdiocese of Nidaros is written by Aslak Bolt.

1435

- The Kalmar War with the Hanseatic League ends.

1436

- The Amund Sigurdsson Bolt Rebellion.

1438

- The Graatop Rebellion.

== 1440s ==
1442

- 4 June – Erik of Pomerania is deposed as King of Norway. His nephew Christopher of Bavaria is elected the new king.

1448

- 5 January – King Christopher dies, leading to a succession crisis in Norway, and the Krummedige-Tre Rosor feud.

1449

- 20 November – Karl Knutsson becomes King of Norway, as Charles I. Thus establishing a short lived personal union between Norway and Sweden.

== 1450s ==
1450

- 4 August – Christian I becomes King of Norway after the abdication of Charles I. From this date the House of Oldenburg would remain on the Norwegian throne until 1814.
- 29 August – The Treaty of Bergen is signed. Danmark and Norway became a union of two equal kingdoms.
- Death of Aslak Bolt, archbishop (born c. 1380).

1455

- 1–2 September – Hanseatic merchants attacked and destroyed Munkeliv Abbey in Bergen. Olav Nilsson, commander of Bergenhus Fortress, was killed in the attack together with Leif Thor Olafsson, Bishop of Bergen and about 60 other Norwegians.
- Birth of Knut Alvsson, nobleman and landowner (d. 1502)
- 1 September – Death of Leif Thor Olafsson, bishop
- 2 September – Death of Olav Nilsson, nobleman, land owner (born c. 1400).

c. 1455

- Birth of Nils Henriksson, knight, landowner, National Counselor, Lord High Steward of Norway (d. 1523)
- Death of Hans Kruckow, knight, royal councillor

== 1460s ==
1468

- Orkney and Shetland were pledged by Christian I, in his capacity as King of Norway, as security against the payment of the dowry of his daughter Margaret, betrothed to James III of Scotland. However, the money was never paid, and Orkney and Shetland was absorbed by the Kingdom of Scotland in 1472.

== 1470s ==
1474

- 25 November - Death of Olav Trondsson, archbishop.

1476

- Norway's oldest surviving knitted garments were made.
- Death of Hartvig Krummedige, nobleman (born c. 1400).

== 1480s ==
1483

- 13 January – King Hans is elected King of Norway, two years after the death of his father and predecessor Christian I.
- 20 July – King Hans is crowned King of Norway.
- Death of Jon Svaleson Smør, nobleman and regent (born c. 1420).
- Death of Elise Eskilsdotter, noblewoman and pirate.

== 1490–1500 ==
1496

- Death of Alv Knutsson, nobleman and landowner (born c. 1420).

1498

- The town of Oddevald is founded.
