= Bolt (surname) =

Bolt is a surname. Notable people with the surname include:

- Andrew Bolt (born 1959), Australian newspaper columnist
- Alex Bolt (born 1993), Australian tennis player
- Aslak Bolt (c. 1380 – 1450), Norwegian priest and archbishop
- Bobby Bolt (1912–1991), Scottish footballer
- Bruce Bolt (1930–2005), American professor
- Carol Bolt (1941–2000), Canadian author
- Chris Bolt (born 1953), British economist
- David Bolt (disambiguation), several people
- Dirk Bolt (1930–2020), Dutch-born architect
- George Bolt (1893–1963), New Zealand aviator
- George T. Bolt (1900–1971), New Zealand government figure
- Herbert Bolt (1893–1916), Australian rugby league player and WWI soldier
- Jan Bolt (1876–1967), Dutch athlete in gymnastics
- Jeremy Bolt (born 1965), British film producer
- John Bolt (theologian), American theologian
- John F. Bolt (1921–2004), American aviator
- Josh Bolt (fl. 2000s – present), British actor
- Klaas Bolt (1927–1990), Dutch musician
- Michael Bolt (fl. 1980s – 1990s), Australia rugby league player
- Ranjit Bolt (born 1959), British author and translator
- Rezin A. De Bolt (1828–1891), American politician
- Richard Bolt (1911–2002), American physics professor
- Richard Bolt (RNZAF officer) (fl. 1940s–1980), New Zealand air marshal
- Robert Bolt (1924–1995), British playwright
- Skye Bolt (born 1994), American baseball player for the San Francisco Giants
- Thomas Bolt (born 1959), American poet and artist
- Tommy Bolt (1916–2008), American golfer
- Usain Bolt (born 1986), Jamaican track athlete
- Wayne Bolt (fl. 1980s – present), American football coach

== See also ==
- Bolt family
- Udo Bölts (born 1966), German cyclist
- William Bolts (1740–1808), Dutch merchant, trader and author
