= Hans Kruckow =

Norway knight

Hans Kruckow (1424 ? - 1455 ?) was a knight and a royal councilor in Norway.

== Background ==
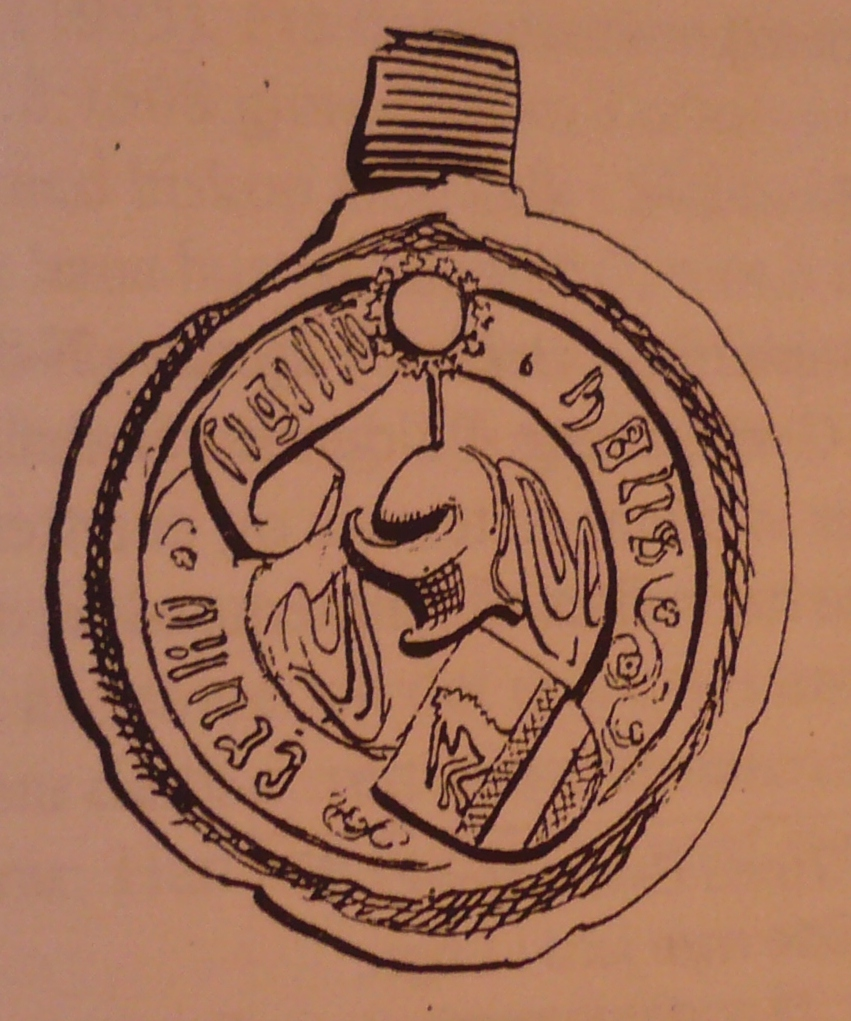
Seal of the knight Hans Kruckow, dated 29 August 1450, showing a unicorn rising from the bars and a helmet bearing a full moon with several little stars. Illustration from the Riksarkivet [Royal Archives of Norway], Kildeskriftavdelingen [Department of Written Sources], Oslo. Photo: Arne Kvitrud, 1996

Hans Kruckow was mentioned for the first time in 1442, when he was in Oslo to proclaim Christopher of Bavaria as the new King of Norway. In 1444 Hans was asked by the King to devise countermeasures against foreigners in Bergen – that is, the members of the Hanseatic League. He was probably living in Bergen at that time, and had an official position there. In February 1447, the German merchants of Bergen presented a letter of complaint to the befalingsman [ commander ] of the Bergenhus about Hans Kruckow.

On 4 December 1444 Hans Kruckow was mentioned for the first time as a member of the Riksråd. He was the last name to be featured on the list, suggesting that he was the youngest member of the Royal Council. To be in the national council of Norway, Hans Kruckow had to have had Norwegian parents or be married to a Norwegian woman. He was married to a Danish woman - Anna Barsebek, so Hans must have had Norwegian parents.

In 1444 he was using the title of væpner (squire) and in 1445 he was described as a knape, which were both titles of the gentry of Norway.

== The Election of the Two Kings ==
Until 1448, Norway, Sweden and Denmark had the same King. In 1448 Christian I was elected as the King of Denmark and Karl Knutsson as the King of Sweden. For Norwegians, it was an important question of whom they would choose to be the King of Norway. In practice, the choice was between the Swedish King and the Danish King. Two groups were formed among Norwegian nobles to support the candidates. In a meeting in Oslo in February 1449 a majority emerged to choose King Christian as the King of Norway. Among the supporters of Karl were Hans Kruckow and the Archbishop of Nidaros, Aslak Bolt. Soon afterwards, Hans Kruckow and six other prominent men were at the Bohus Fortress in Båhuslen, near the Swedish border. They wanted King Charles to be the King of Norway. They wrote that they were supporting King Charles of Sweden because they believed that Norway and Sweden should be united. Nevertheless, in March 1449, the Riksråd of Norway made King Christian the King of Norway.

On 17 June 1449 the King of Sweden – Charles – came to Trondheim. Here the Archbishop crowned him the King of Norway. After the coronation Charles went back to Sweden. The coronation was contrary to the majority decision of the Riksråd and a clear challenge from the Archbishop and King Charles. The Riksråd was then summoned on short notice to meet in Marstrand. On 3 July 1449 Hans Kruckow was with the Riksråd in Marstrand. There King Christian was declared to be the rightful heir to the throne of Erik of Pomerania. Hans Kruckow then switched sides to support the decision of the Royal Council but he, together with the Archbishop, wrote and sealed several letters. His acts may be interpreted to mean that, while he did not accept the decision, he was reconciled with the fact that King Christian was legally elected. On 1 August 1450 24 members of the Riksråd, including Hans Kruckow, declared that Christian, not Karl Knutsson, was the lawful King of Norway. King Charles' coronation in Trondheim was therefore invalid and King Christian was crowned in his place.

== Knighthood ==
The first mention of Hans Kruckow as a knight was 30 May 1450, when he was part of an agreement between Norway and Denmark. He has been in Denmark sometime between July 1449 and May 1450 to receive the knighthood from the King.

On 25 April 1453 the new Archbishop of Nidaros, Henrik Kalteisen, traveled with companions, including Hans Kruckow, from Bergen to Trondheim. On the way, they came into battle with the Swede Ørjan Karlson and his companions. The Archbishop and his men survived and Ørjan fled afterwards to his native Jämtland with his followers. It is believed that the King of Sweden was behind this attack. In Trondheim Kruckow was one of the members of the Frostating who signed the letter of proclamation of King Christian.

Hans Kruckow had made the complete turnaround. But did he accept it? That is not known for certain. Soon afterwards he retired to a monastery. It is possible that his support of the Swedish King and the Hanseatic League's growing military might made it too dangerous for him to stay in Bergen. Perhaps he was also fulfilling his own religious obligations. But his true reasons remain unknown to this day.

== At Munkeliv ==
On 8 October 1453 the knight Hans Kruckow had moved to the Munkeliv Abbey, near Bergen. He gave all his properties and goods to the monastery. This is the last known mention of Hans Kruckow. The date of his death is not yet known. Hans had enough funds to live as a retiree at the monastery. He might have been accompanied by his servants and, if she was still living, his wife. In 1455 Munkeliv was stormed and burned by the forces of the Hanseatic League. Those who lived in the monastery either were killed or managed to escape. It is possible that Hans Kruckow was killed there.

== Literature ==
- (in Norwegian) Henning [Johannes Peterssøn] Sollied, “Nogen oplysninger om slekterne Kruckow, Haar og Benkestok [ A Few Notes on the Kruckow, Haar and Benkestok Families ],” Norsk Slektshistorisk Tidsskrift, bind III [ Journal of the Norwegian Family History, Volume III ], Oslo, 1932, pages 274-300.
- (in Norwegian) Nicolai Stene, “Kruckow'erne i Norge [ Kruckows in Norway ],” Norsk Slektshistorisk Tidsskrift, bind III, Oslo, 1932, pages 137-159.
- (in Norwegian) Arne Kvitrud, “Luster etter den store mannedaude” [ Luster after the Great Plague ], Stavanger, 1998.
