= Aspa family =

Norwegian family

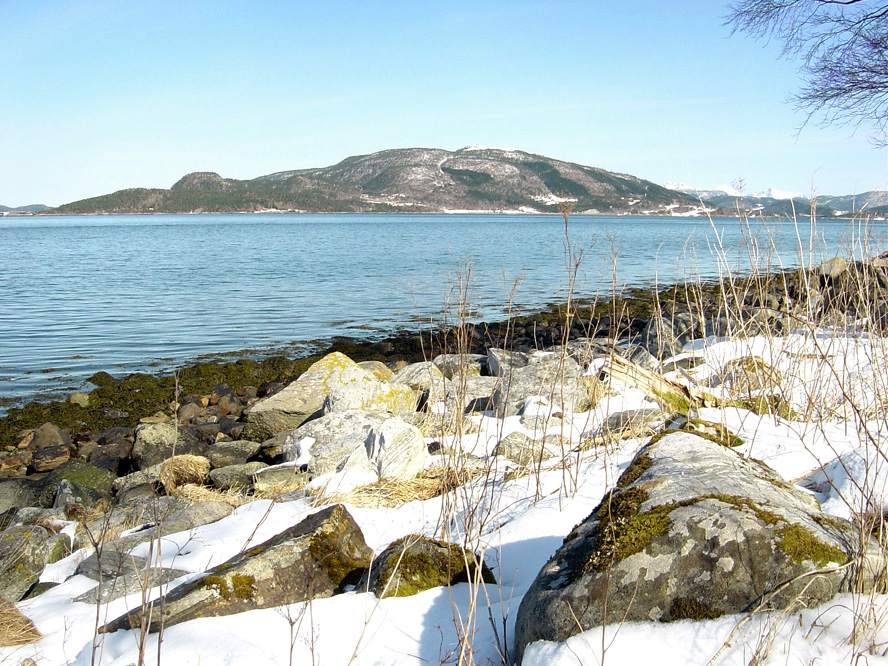
The island of Aspøya, the original home of the Aspa family.

Aspa is the collective name of both the farm and the group of interrelated Norwegian families of noble origins in Møre og Romsdal, a fylke (county) in western Norway. Several members of this group played significant roles in the political and ecclesiastical history of Norway in the Middle Ages. The group's name comes from its origin, the Aspa and Boksaspa farms on the island of Aspøya in present-day Tingvoll Municipality in Møre og Romsdal county.

== The Family ==
Most of the family can be divided into three main branches:

- Aslak Jonsson and his descendants
- Trond Toraldsson and his descendants
- Thorstein Eiriksson and his descendants

The first certain members of the clan were Aslak Jonsson (died before 1463) and his wife, Lady Gro. The title of "Lady" suggests that she was previously married to a knight.

Aslak was mentioned in 1443, when he willed his estate, including one-half of the Aspa farm to his daughter Jorann, who was married to Trond Toraldsson. They were the parents of the 25th Archbishop of Nidaros, Olav Trondsson (d. 1474). His brother Ivar Trondsson of Aspa (mentioned 1453–1489) inherited the farm from his mother. It is possible that he married a woman from the Teiste family, the clan that might have produced Hans Bjørnsson Teiste, the 29th Bishop of Bergen.

Olav and Ivar donated, in 1473, a large part of their lands, consisting a number of farms in Nordmøre, to the Nidaros Cathedral for a period of 30 years but a hundred years and several lawsuits would pass before the donation was returned to the Aspa family. On 11 September 1578 in Trondheim, the Herredag declared Ivar's grandson, Auden Tostensson of Aspa, the rightful heir to all the original Aspa properties of the cathedral.

Auden's daughter's son Auden Ågesson settled at Molde, as the owner of several farms, including Reknes. In other branches of the clan, the surname Trygge occurred later but its origins are uncertain.

There is a prevailing theory among the Norwegian genealogists that Jorunn, the mother of the 28th and last Catholic Archbishop of Nidaros, Olav Engelbrektsson, might be from the Aslak Jonsson branch of the Aspa family as the daughter of Ivar Trondsson from Frei in Nordmøre, and the niece of Olav Trondsson, the 26th Archbishop. But, throughout the lives of Jorunn and her son, the records were more concerned with the church, the politics and the wars than with the families. So there may not be enough evidence to prove that Jorunn was the niece of Olav Trondsson and the mother of Olav Engelbrektsson as well as the sister of the 26th Archbishop of Nidaros Gaute Ivarsson, and the grandmother of Torbjørn Olavssøn Bratt, the first Lutheran "superintendent" of Trondheim. Engelbrektsson did help with the education and careers of Torbjørn and his brother, Jens Olavssøn Bratt, but their biographies at Norsk Biografisk Leksikon do not name him as their uncle and Jorunn as their grandmother.

== Bibliography ==
=== Books (all in Norwegian) ===
- Tore Hermundsson Vigerust, editor, Aspa-seminaret [ The Aspa Seminar ] : Sandvika 25 oktober 1996, Kristiansund 6–7 september 1997, in : Adelsprosjektets skrifter, bind 2 [ Writings of the Nobility Project, Volume 2 ] (Oslo : Adelsprosjektet, kane.benkestokk.teiste forlag [ Nobility Project, Kane. Benkestokk. Teiste Publications ], 1997), ISBN 82-91870-00-4
- Finn Oldervik, "Ouden Oudenson i Aspen – har han levd? Gaute Ivarson – var han likevel son til Ivar Trondson i Aspen? [ Ouden Oudenson of Aspen - Did He Exist? Guate Ivarson – Was He Really the Son of Ivar Trondson of Aspen? ]", in : Jan H. Leithe and Hedvig Wist, editors, Årbok for Nordmøre 1998 [ Yearbook of North Møre 1998 ] (Kristiansund : Nordmøre Historielag [ Historical Society of Nordmøre ], 1998), ISSN 0333-2152, pages 71–77
- Anders Stølen, "Olav Engelbrektsson og Aspe=ætta : Resyme over synspunkt [ Olav Engelbrektsson and the Aspa Family : Summary of the Theories", in : Bjørn Austigard and Rolf Strand, editors, Romsdal Sogelag Årsskrift 1995 [ 1995 Yearbook of the Historical Society of Romsdal ] (Molde : A.s. EKH and Engers Boktrykkeri, 1995), ISBN 82-90169-48-5, pages 221-234
- Ottar Roaldset, Gards- og ættesoge for Straumsnes, bind III [ History of the Families and Farms of Straumsnes, Volume 3 ], (Tingvoll : Tingvoll Sogelag [ Historical Society of Tingvoll ], 1999), pages 438 ff.

=== Periodicals (all in Norwegian) ===
- Oddvar Grønli, "Ei ættetavla frå reformasjonstida [ A Genealogical Chart from the Time of the Reformation ]", Norsk Slektshistorisk Tidsskrift [ Norwegian Genealogical Journal ], Volume 13, Issue 2 ( Oslo : Norsk Slektshistorisk Forening [ Norwegian Genealogical Society ], 1952), pages 209–244
- Arne I. Hoem, "Litt mer om Aspaslekten og slekten Hagerup [ A Little More about the Aspa and Hagerup Families ]", Norsk Slektshistorisk Tidsskrift, Volume 25 (Oslo : Norsk Slektshistorisk Forening, 1975), pages 154-156
- Magnus Mardal, "Aspaslekten - en nordmørsk stormannsslekt fra 1200-tallet [ Apsa Clan – A Prominent Family in North Norway from the 1200s ]", Norsk Slektshistorisk Tidsskrift, Volume 32 (Oslo : Norsk Slektshistorisk Forening, 1989), pages 53–63
- Klaus Johan Grønseth Myrvoll, "Eitkvart nytt um Aspa-ætti [ A New Quarter for the Aspa Clan ]", Norsk Slektshistorisk Tidsskrift, Volume 36, Issue 4 (Oslo : Norsk Slektshistorisk Forening, 1998), pages 273-282
- Klaus Johan Grønseth Myrvoll, "Margrete i Aspa – løysing på floken [ Margaret of Aspa – The Solution to the Puzzle ]", Norsk Slektshistorisk Tidsskrift, Volume 41, Issue 1 (Oslo : Norsk Slektshistorisk Forening, 2007), pages 42–63

== Other sources ==
- Diplomatarium Norvegicum [ Latin, Diplomas of Norway ], Volume XXI, No. 415
