= Aslak Bolt's cadastre =

Norwegian cadastre

Title page of P. A. Munch's printed edition of Aslak Bolts jordebog from 1852.

Aslak Bolt's cadastre (Norwegian: Aslak Bolts jordebog; written 1432–1433) is a Norwegian cadastre, a detailed register of properties and incomes of the Archdiocese of Nidaros.

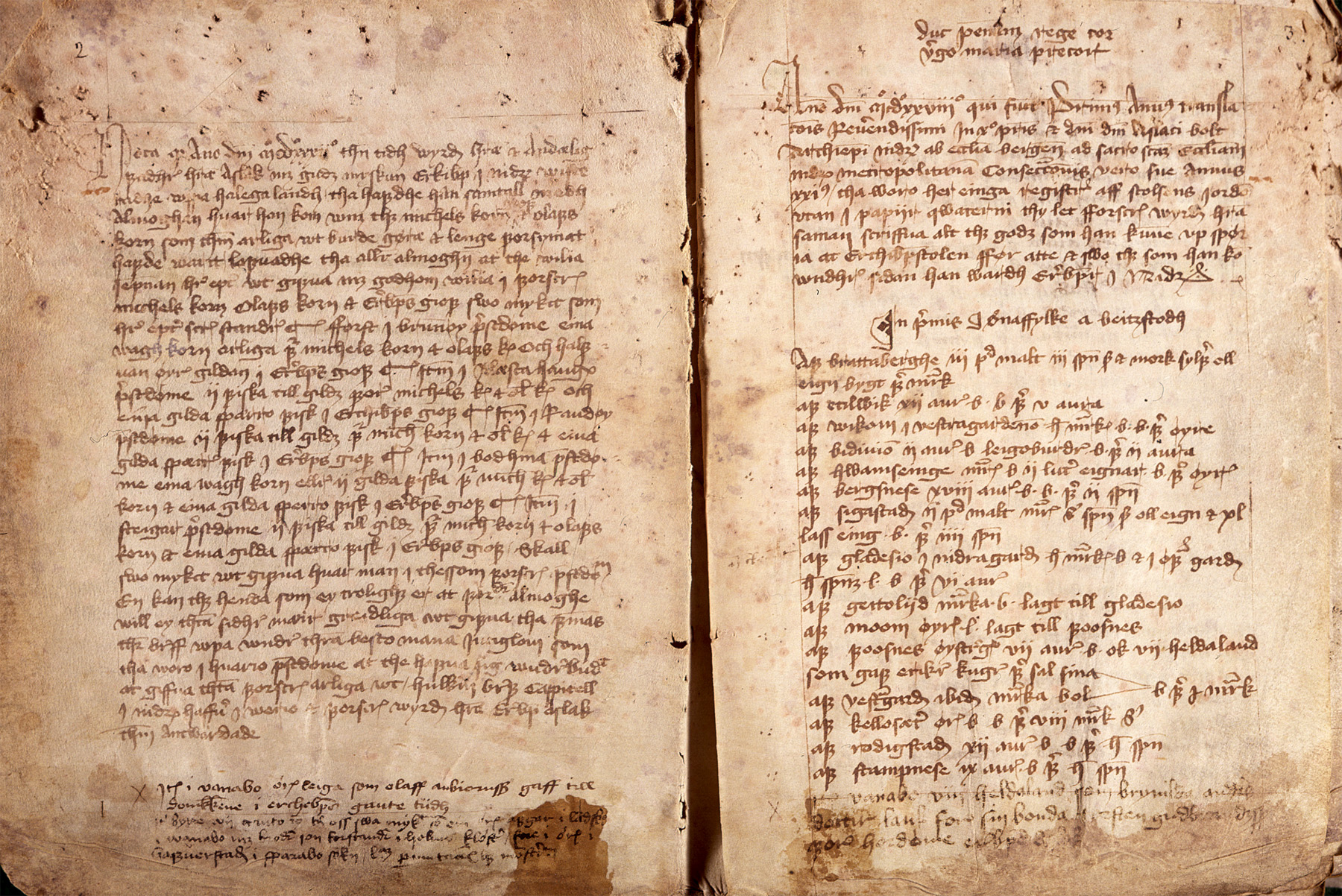
Aslak Bolts jordebok

== History ==
Aslak Bolt's cadastre was a register of land ownership with the Archdiocese of Nidaros. The cadastre comprises more than 3000 farms, with information about scope and volume of income. The document is originally written on the instruction of archbishop Aslak Bolt (c. 1380 – 1450), Archbishop of the Diocese of Nidaros. It was probably completed in 1432 and 1433, with later supplements and corrections. The properties of the archdiocese included several thousand farms. The records in the land register are arranged topographically by counties within the diocese. The cadastre is regarded as an important primary historical source, both for historical economic research, and for research of place names.

The original document was written on pergament and is now deposited at the National Archives of Norway (Riksarkivet). The information contained in the cadastre was published by historian Peter Andreas Munch (1810 – 1863) in 1852. It was later published in 1997 by the National Archives of Norway. This edition is bilingual, so that the left-hand reference sheet provides the most faithful interpretation or transcript possible, while the right-hand reference sheet is the text rendered in modern Norwegian. However, some place names have not been identified and are thus reproduced in their original form.

== Related reading ==
- Jørgensen, Jon Gunnar (1997) Aslak Bolts jordebok (Oslo : Riksarkivet) ISBN 82-548-0052-9
