= Olav Trondsson =

- Archbishop of Nidaros; 1459–1474
- Church: Roman Catholic
- Archdiocese: Nidaros
- Appointed: 14 Feb 1459
- Predecessor: Aslak Bolt
- Successor: Gaute Ivarsson

Orders
- Consecration: 28 June 1459

Personal details
- Born: Norway
- Died: November 25, 1474 Rome, Papal States
- Buried: Basilica of Sant'Agostino, Rome; 41°54′4″N 12°28′27″E
- Education: University of Rostock (1433); University of Greifswald (1438)

Olav Trondsson (died November 25, 1474) was the twenty-fourth Catholic archbishop of the Archdiocese of Nidaros in Norway from 1459 until his death in 1474.

== Background ==
Olav Trondsson was of noble descent. His parents were probably Trond Toraldsson Smørhatt and Joran Aslaksdotter. His father belonged to the Smørhatt family, while his mother descended from the Aspa.

Trondsson was enrolled at the University of Rostock in 1430, where he obtained a baccalaureate degree in 1433. In 1438 he was awarded the degree Magister in Artibus from the University of Greifswald, which at that time had just been formed.

He is mentioned as a canon of the cathedral in Nidaros for the first time in 1446.

== Appointment as archbishop ==
Trondsson was appointed archbishop of Nidaros in 1458, ending a few years of struggle over the appointment between Pope Nicholas V/Pope Calixtus III, the cathedral chapter of Nidaros, and King Christian I.

When Archbishop Aslak Bolt died in 1450, the chapter had chosen Trondsson as his successor. After strong pressure from the king, however, they were compelled to alter their choice in favor of the Franciscan Marcellus de Niveriis. The Pope, in turn, refused to appoint Marcellus and instead appointed Henrik Kalteisen. Kalteisen was forced to leave the country shortly thereafter and asked the pope for his dismissal. Meanwhile, Trondsson acted as administrator of the archdiocese and his candidacy was once again promoted by the chapter.

Finally, in 1458, Callixtus dismissed Kalteisen and appointed Trondsson. Trondsson left for Rome in the autumn of that year to retrieve his pallium and perform some diplomatic interventions for the king. He met the pope in Perugia, where he was staying on his way to Mantua for a meeting. Trondsson was greeted with a favorable reception, and in February 1459 he was ordained a bishop in Perugia and took office the following year in Nidaros.

== Archbishop of Nidaros ==
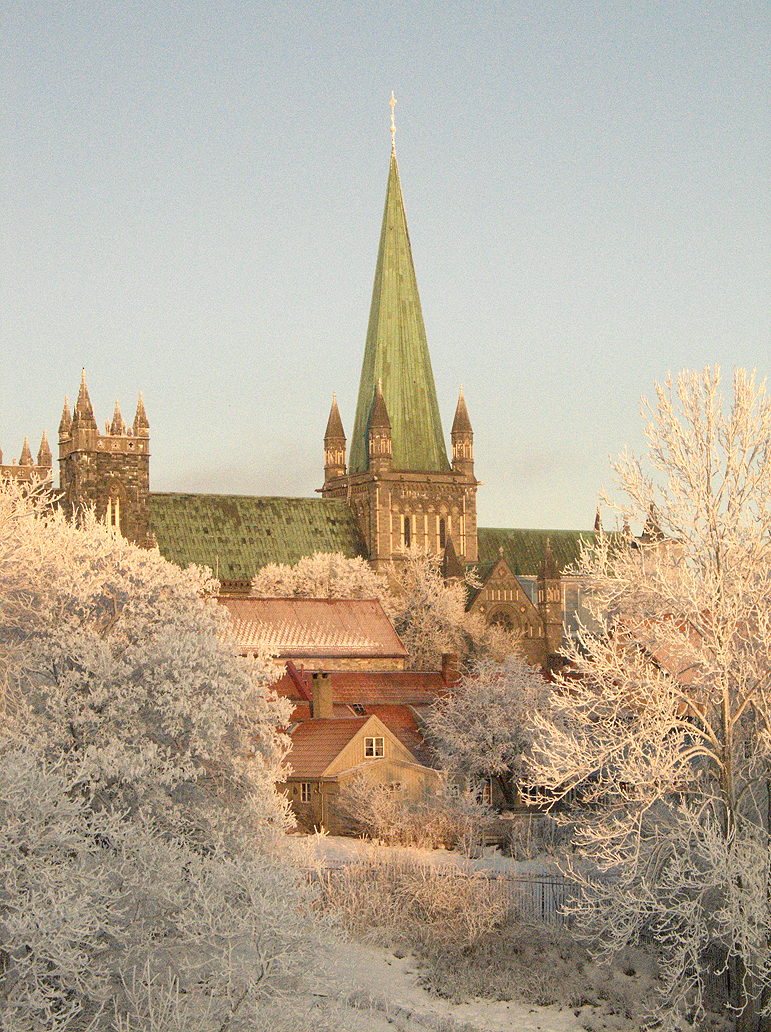
The cathedral chapter of Nidaros benefited from Trondsson's favor as archbishop.

Not many details are known about Trondsson's fifteen-year tenure as archbishop, but everything indicates that he was both wise and honest in his management of the see and that he possessed considerable diplomatic skills. For example, even in the turbulent 1450s, Trondsson won the king's favor, which was part of the reason why the king upheld the cathedral chapter's old privileges and rewarded every canon a tax-free farm. Also, during his stay in Perugia, he had requested and obtained a seven-year indulgence privilege for the cathedral of Nidaros. For the Norwegian church as a whole, however, the greatest result was that, in 1458, the king upheld the 1277 Tønsberg Sættargjerden concordat, which had defined certain questions of ecclesiastical jurisdiction and freedoms in the Church's favor.

Trondsson was, in many ways, similar to his predecessor, Aslak Bolt. But while Bolt had been most keen to strengthen the finances of his archbishopric, Trondsson implemented several measures to strengthen the cathedral chapter. It was probably Trondsson who was responsible for the chapter receiving a new prelature. Furthermore, in 1473 he bequeathed his substantial private estates, and the right to their proceeds, to the cathedral for 30 years. (In practice, however, the cathedral kept the properties for 100 years; the land became a prebend for one of the cathedral canons and only later was it returned to Trondsson's heirs.)

Helgeseter Priory also benefited from Trondsson's revival. The monastery had suffered under Bolt, who seems to have been strict on the monastery estate's income. Trondsson put the monastery on its feet both structurally and economically, and appointed a new prior. He also showed concern for even the most distant parts of his archbishopric. When he helped the farmers in the remote village of Hodal in Herjedalen obtain their own church and priest, the townspeople sent him a six-pound pike in expression of their gratitude.

In 1474 Trondsson travelled to Rome, accompanied by the newly elected bishop of Bergen, Hans Teiste. The purpose of the trip may have been to make the required ad limina visit, but doubtless its timing was also intended to coincide with the events of the Jubilee Year of 1475. He did reach Rome, but died there on November 25, 1474. He was buried in the Augustinian monastery complex of Sant'Agostino. In 1486 a stone was placed on his grave with the following inscription:

CVI DEDERAT SACRAM MERITO NORVEGIA SEDEM HIC TEGIT OLAVI FRIGIDVS OSSA LAPIS Here a cold stone covers the bones of Olav, to whom Norway rightly gave the holy chair.

The original marker no longer stands in place, but a replacement was erected in 1924.

== Bibliography ==
- Daae, L. (1897). "En Krønike om Erkebiskopperne i Nidaros". Festskrift udgivet i Anledning af Trondhjems 900 Aars Jubilæum. Trondheim: 161–168.
- Dybdahl, A. (1989). Jordeiendomsforhold og godseiere i Trøndelag. Steinkjer. p. 290ff.
- Grønli, O. (1951–52). "Ei ættetavla frå reformasjonstida". 13: 209–244.
- Hamre, L. (1955). Fjellbu, A. (ed.). "Fredstid og riksrådspolitikk". Nidaros Erkebispestol og Bispesete 1153–1953. 1: 491ff.
- Kolsrud, O. (1924). "Erkebiskop Olav Throndsson av Nidaros 1459–1474". Norvegia Sacra: 19–34.
- Vigerust, T. (1997). "Aspaseminaret". Adelsprosjektets skrifter. 2.
