= Contemporary French Civilisation =

Peer-reviewed academic journal

Contemporary French Civilization is a peer-reviewed academic journal published by Liverpool University Press. It was founded in 1978.

Its editor-in-chief is Denis M. Provencher of the University of Arizona.
