= Marcellus de Niveriis =

German Franciscan priest

Marcellus de Niveriis, O.F.M., also known as Marcellus of Skálholt (d. 1460 or 1462, at sea, near the coast of Sweden), was a German Franciscan and an adventurer who was the 26th Bishop of Skálholt from 1448 until his death, although he never came to Iceland.

== Crimes, arrests and escapes ==
Marcellus is believed to have been born in the village of Nievern an der Lahn, five miles [seven kilometers] southeast of Koblenz, in Germany. It is from this birthplace that he had his Latin surname, Niveriis ["from Nievern"]. Nothing else is known about his origins. He was apparently very well educated.

The first known mention of Marcellus was in 1426, when he was arrested in Lübeck for selling forged letters of mortgage and subsequently escaped from prison. He then pretended to be a monk of the Church of the Holy Sepulchre until he met a fellow Franciscan friar. Then, with the help of his new friend, he pretended to be a Knight of St. John throughout northern Germany to collect the money for ransoming the King of Cyprus from Turkish captivity. He was again arrested but escaped. He was next found in the service of Henry Cardinal Beaufort, who was the envoy of Pope Martin V in Germany. When it came out that Marcellus was an escapee, he was arrested and imprisoned. He then escaped and fled, only to be captured and sentenced to be led through the streets and symbolically hanged. In August 1428, he was sentenced to imprisonment for life. He was kept in the tower of the Prince-Archbishop of Cologne's prison in Brühl, 12.5 miles (20 kilometers) south of Cologne. The conditions of his cell were so bad that he wrote and sent letters, which have been preserved, to the officers of the Prince-Archbishop to beg for his freedom. He was redeemed and freed after allegedly curing the Prince-Archbishop, Dietrich II of Moers, of a dangerous illness. By then, his deeds were so notorious that rumors of them were heard at the Council of Basel. In 1431, he was assigned to Neuss as a priest and canon but he was not happy there. In 1439 he fell into debauchery but he continued to minister until 1442. He seemed to have enjoyed great popularity in the parish. He then settled in Cologne and lived there for a while.

== The Bishop and the Archbishop ==
In 1447, Nicholas V was Pope. Marcellus hurried to Rome and paid homage to him. He was able to persuade him to appoint him, on 15 April 1448, as the 26th Bishop of Skálholt, the Papal Nuncio of Iceland, and the Collector of Papal Revenues for Scandinavia. But Marcellus did not leave immediately for Iceland. He seemed to have stayed for a while in Rome, where he had encounters with many notables. He then went to Denmark, where Christian I of Denmark had become the King, introduced himself as the Pope's representative and quickly charmed the young king. He followed the King to Norway in the summer of 1450 and crowned him as the King of Norway on 29 August in the Cathedral of Nidaros in Trondheim. He even managed to get the new King to void the election of the new Archbishop of Nidaros and appoint Marcellus as the replacement.

Marcellus went back to Rome to have the Pope confirm his new position. But when Marcellus arrived, he heard that Nicholas V had just gotten a lengthy report about his crimes and sins. He fled from Rome to avoid arrest and imprisonment and went north to Cologne, where he owned a house. There he faked the Pope's letters of introduction and protection to support himself. He was arrested in the autumn of 1451 but he managed to escape yet again. He was still the Bishop of Skálholt but was replaced on 13 June 1450 as the Collector of Papal Revenues for Scandinavia by Birger Månsson of Uppsala, the future Bishop of Västerås.

In the spring of 1452, Marcellus was back in the good graces of the Pope, who immediately sent the invitation to Christian I. He told the King that he would give him special treatment if Marcellus was restored as the Archbishop of Nidaros. At that time, the Archbishop was Heinrich Kalteisen (Henrik Kalteisen in Norwegian and Danish, Hinrik Kaldajárn in Icelandic), one of the most respected scholars in Germany. He also happened to be from Koblenz, just five miles (7 kilometers) northwest of Nievern an der Lahn. He was the Pope's man, sent to remedy the problems caused by Marcellus, but he was not the King's man. Nevertheless, he went to Copenhagen and managed to convince Christian to keep him as the Archbishop instead of Marcellus. However, as soon as Heinrich was gone, Marcellus arrived. He quickly gained the trust of the King again and presented letters to show that he had been greatly disrespected and mistreated. But these letters were actually forged by Marcellus himself. After a great deal of conflict and political maneuvering, the dispute ended in the summer of 1454, when Kalteisen resigned and went south to Rome. But Marcellus did not get the Archdiocese of Nidaros; it went instead to Olav Trondsson – the choice of the Cathedral Chapter.

== The Chancellor and the King ==
Marcellus went to Rome to press his claim with the Pope on the Archdiocese but he was not successful. On his way back to Copenhagen, he was attacked, robbed and imprisoned in Cologne, perhaps with the encouragement from the Papal authorities, but he managed to get himself released from the prison. To avenge the mistreatment of his friend, Christian I confiscated all the assets of the Archbisophric's people who were living and visiting within his kingdom. His actions set off a series of conflicts that did not finish until the late 1470s, when Marcellus had already been dead for more than a decade.

Marcellus stayed at the court of the King of Denmark and Norway. With the titles of the King's Chancellor, the Royal Councilor and the Bishop of Skálholt, he was one of the most powerful and influential men in Denmark and indeed all of Scandinavia. The Danish historian, Johannes Peder Lindbæk, believed that Marcellus was the main architect of Denmark's policies and attitudes towards the Catholic Church so much that he labelled the first twelve years of Christian I's reign as "Marcellus's Time". In Iceland, however, Marcellus was anonymous. He never came to Iceland and he didn't much impact on its affairs. He collected his income from the church chapter of Skálholt, was the master of the Vestmannaeyjar (Icelandic, "Westmann Islands", Vestmannaøerne in Danish, a gift from King Christian) manor, and had the authority to sell trading and fishing licenses to the English in Iceland. He was able to win most of the Icelandic höfðingjar [chieftains] over to his side but he is known to have banned the priest-poet, Jón "Maríuskáld [Mary's Poet]" Pálsson, but the reasons are not known. To oversee his diocese in Iceland, Marcellus had Andrew, already the Bishop of Garðar in nearby Greenland, appointed as the Vice-Bishop (or Vicar) of Skálholt. But, for commercial and financial matters in Iceland, Marcellus had two other assistants, Bjorn Thorleifsson and Daniel Kepken, who were as unscrupulous as he was.

In 1457, Marcellus was the master of ceremonies when the first known investiture of the Order of the Elephant was made. It is possible that he might have helped King Christian with the details of the founding of the Order.

Meanwhile, King Christian remained loyal to Marcellus until 1458, when Pius II was elected as the new Pope, he realized that Marcellus had become a political liability. So he quietly dropped Marcellus and the latter's influence declined at the Court.

Sometime between 27 February 1460 and October 1462, Marcellus fell out of a ship off the coast of Sweden and drowned. 1462 is the more likely year because in October 1462 King Christian recognized the election of Jón Stefánsson Krabbe, a Dane, as the new Bishop of Skálholt.

== Bibliography ==
- (in Norwegian) Audun Dybdahl, "Marcellus", Norsk Biografisk Leksikon [Norwegian Biographical Dictionary], retrieved 11 January 2014.
- (in German) Oluf Kolsrud, author, and Ute Brand-Berg, editor, Marcellus de Niveriis : aus dem Leben eines großen Abenteurers [Marcellus de Niveriis : The Life of a Great Adventurer], 4 volumes (Bad Ems : Verein für Geschichte, Denkmal- und Landschaftspflege [Society of the Preservation of History, Monuments and Land], 1993), published as Issues 111-114 of Bad Emser Hefte [Bad Ems Pamphlets]
- (in Danish) Joh[anne]s. [Peder] Lindbæk, Pavernes Forhold til Danmark under Kongerne Kristiern I og Hans [Denmark's Relationship with the Popes under Kings Christian I and John] (Copenhagen : Nielsen & Lydiche, 1907), pages 13-53.
- (in Danish) [Arthur William Julius] Mollerup, "Marcellus", Dansk biografisk Lexikon, XI. Bind. Maar – Müllner [Danish Biographical Dictionary, 9th Volume : Maar – Müllner ] (Copenhagen : Gyldendalske Boghandels Forlag [Gyldendal Bookshops & Publications] [F. Hegel & Søn], Græbes Bogtrykkeri [Græbe Book Printers], 1897), pages 110–111.
- (in Icelandic) Björn Þorsteinsson, Ævintýri Marcellusar Skálholtsbiskups [The Adventures of Marcellus, the Bishop of Skálholt] (Reykjavík : Heimskringla, 1965)
- Janus Møller Jensen, Denmark and the Crusades: 1400 – 1650 (Leiden : Koninklijke Brill NV, 2007), ISBN 978-90-04-15579-4, pages 70 ff.
- Kirsten A. Seaver, The Frozen Echo: Greenland and the Exploration of North America ca A.D. 1000–1500 (Stanford, California : Stanford University Press, 1996), ISBN 0-8047-3161-6, pages 189–190, 195-197
- Thomas B[enjamin]. Willson, History of the Church and State in Norway from the Tenth Century to the Sixteenth Century (Westminster : Archibald Constable & Co., Ltd., 1903), pages 280–285.
