= Henrik Kalteisen =

German theologian and archbishop

- Archbishop of Nidaros
- Church: Roman Catholic
- Archdiocese: Nidaros
- Appointed: 28 February 1452
- Term ended: 1458
- Predecessor: Aslak Bolt
- Successor: Olav Trondsson

Personal details
- Born: c. 1390 Koblenz, Electorate of Trier
- Died: 2 October 1464 (aged 73–74)
- Residence: Archbishop's Palace, Nidaros

Henrik Kalteisen or Heinrich Kalteisen, O.P., S.T.D. (probably around 1390, in Koblenz, Electorate of Trier – 2 October 1464, in same place ), was a German theologian and, from 1452 to 1458, the 24th Archbishop of Nidaros in Norway.

== Background ==
The exact date of birth and parents of Heinrich Kalteisen are not known but he was probably from Koblenz in the Electorate of Trier (now Germany). He belonged to the Dominican Order. He studied at the Universities of Vienna and Cologne, where he earned a Magister's degree and a doctorate. Until 1424 he was inquisitor for Mainz, Cambrai and Leuven. From 1430 he held the title of doctor sacrae theologiae professor [ Latin, "Professor Doctor of Sacred Theology" ] and taught in Mainz. in 1433 he participated on behalf of the Archbishop of Mainz, Conrad III of Dhaun, in the Council of Basel, where he became known for his three speeches against the Hussites during a disputation with the Hussite priest Ulrich from the Party of Sirotčí.

Kalteisen was a counselor for Pope Eugene IV on the matters of theology and law and was Master of the Sacred Palace from 1439 to 1452. He was a learned man with broad knowledge of theology and canon law as well as of Roman law, philosophy and history. He filled his copy-books with copies of incoming letters and with drafts and copies of outgoing letters, many of which he himself composed and sent. These copy-books are the main reason for his enduring fame. He is also known to have written at least 50 works in Latin and several of his sermons have also been preserved.

== The Archbishop ==
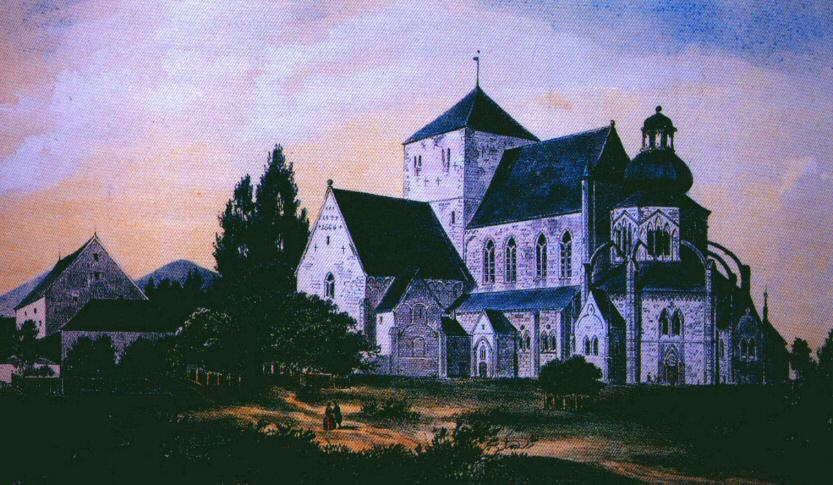
The Cathedral of Nidaros, c. 1830, painting by Mathias F. Dalager.

After the death of Archbishop Aslak Bolt in 1450 it came down between the Cathedral Chapter, the King and the Pope in a dispute over the right of succession to the throne of the Archbishop in Nidaros. The Chapter had immediately chosen the canon, Olav Trondsson, as the successor. The King of Denmark and Norway, Christian I of Denmark, protested the election. He wanted his follower Marcellus of Skálholt as the archbishop. He and the Cathedral Chapter took their dispute to an arbitration court and the court invalidated the election of Olav Trondsson. Under the pressure from the King, the chapter then voted for Marcellus. But the choice was rejected by Pope Nicholas V because Marcellus was considered to be a swindler and adventurer. (Note: The assessment is correct. Marcellus was indeed a swindler and adventurer. A renegade Franciscan friar from Nievern ( 5 miles or 7 kilometers southeast of Koblenz ), Marcellus kept getting arrested and escaping from prison all over northern Germany. Rumors of his misdeeds were even heard at the Council of Basel but he managed to make friends and allies in the high places. One of them was Christian I. He remained loyal to Marcellus until 1568, when Pius II was elected as the new Pope, Christian realized that Marcellus had become a political liability. So Marcellus was dropped and a few years later, in 1462, he drowned off the Swedish coast. See Jensen, Denmark and the Crusades, pages 70-73; Lindbæk, Pavernes Forhold, pages 13-53; and Willson, Church of Norway, pages 280-285 for more details. Lindbæk, the Danish historian, even labelled the first 12 years of Christian I's reign as "Marcellus's Time" because he believed that Marcellus directed all the policies of the King towards the Catholic Church.) On 27 February 1452, the Pope settled the matter with the appointment of Henrik Kalteisen to keep his own man in the Church of Norway. Kalteisen paid for this appointment 800 florins and a few other smaller amounts to the Papal Chamber.

In the summer of 1452 Kalteisen travelled to first Copenhagen and then Bergen. In Copenhagen, he was welcomed by the King. But, as soon as Kalteisen was gone, Christian I declared in his letters that he would not accept him as the Archbishop of Nidaros. Calling him "irreligious", he considered the rumors of his holiness and education to be exaggerated. Meanwhile, in Bergen, Kalteisen spent the winter of 1452 and 1453 administrating his new archbishopric. Most of his time was spent on numerous legal issues of the church in Norway and the parish business from Iceland, where he was known as Hinrik Kaldajárn in Icelandic. On the morning of Pentecost Sunday, 20 May 1453, he was solemnly consecrated in Nidaros. He was well received by the Cathedral Chapter there but a couple of Norwegian monasteries did not wish to be under his jurisdiction.

As it happened, the new archbishop lasted for only a few months in Nidaros; he neglected his new home, calling it a "barn". At that time, a war between Denmark and Sweden was brewing. On his way to Trondheim for the consecration, the Archbishop and his companions were attacked on 25 April 1453 by the Swededish-Norwegian, Ørjan Karlson, (Note: Ørjan Karlson Skanke of Hov ( c. 1400 – 1474 ) was the governor of Jämtland and Härjedalen from 1449 to 1457 and the first knight ever to be born in Jamtland. One of the five sons of Karl Pederson, Ørjan was knighted for his military services in 1449 by King Charles VIII in the Cathedral of Nidaros in Trondheim at the latter's coronation. Ørjan was loyal to his King to the very end. In 1457, he was left in the command of the Tre Kronor [ Swedish, "Three Crowns" ] Castle in Stockholm by the King, who had fled to Danzig, but the Castle fell in the Midsummer Siege to the Danes and he was captured and tortured. He was released. But in 1463 he was back in jail, with the Archbishop of Uppsala, Jöns Bengtsson Oxenstierna, for company, on the charges of conspiracy against King Christian I of Denmark and Norway. The subsequent rebellion by the Archbishop's relatives saved their lives, and Ørjan was out and back in Jämtland by 1469. He lived out his life in retirement but one source claims that he was killed by the Swedes and buried in Norway.) and his troops. The Archbishop and his men were able to fight them off. Ørjan and his men fled afterwards to his native Jämtland. It is believed that the King of Sweden, Knut Knutsson, was behind this attack. Therefore, after the consecration, Kalteisen moved to Bergen for safety.

Nevertheless, Kalteisen tried to take the initiative with plans to inspect not just the Cathedral Chapter but the whole Archdiocese. His copybooks showed that he invested a lot of effort in familiarizing himself with the circumstances of his Archdiocese. He made a number of decisions in ecclesiastical law but he found the time to write a little history of the diocese of the Faroe Islands. He was also planning to build the new cathedral in Nidaros.

== The Opposition ==
Meanwhile, Marcellus had regained the confidence of the King and accused Kalteisen of incompetence in the office. So Christian I invited Kalteisen to come to Bergen for the arbitration, which turned into a violent altercation with Marcellus. Kalteisen invoked the authority of the Pope, while Marcellus took for the decrees of the Council of Basel and the privileges of the Norwegian Church for his own claim. In the end, the matter was referred to Pope Nicholas V. The King brought to the Riksråd of Norway the letter, in which he exaggerated the problems with the establishment of Kalteisen as the archbishop. He wrote that the Archbishop could not connect with the people and could not speak their language and threatened to close down the Norwegian Church, adding that the Archbishop's accusations against Marcellus were unfounded. However, it is not certain that the letter to the Pope was actually sent but the King's intentions were clear. In his letter to King Alfonso V of Aragon and Naples, Christian I wrote that he was thinking of converting to the Russian Orthodox Church. He did not convert but, in the end, he was able to turn the Norwegian Riksrad and most of the Cathedral Chapter against the Archbishop. The Cathedral Chapter itself wrote to the Pope that Kalteisen had become so unpopular in Trondheim that he had to be rescued from physical abuse by the King's officers.

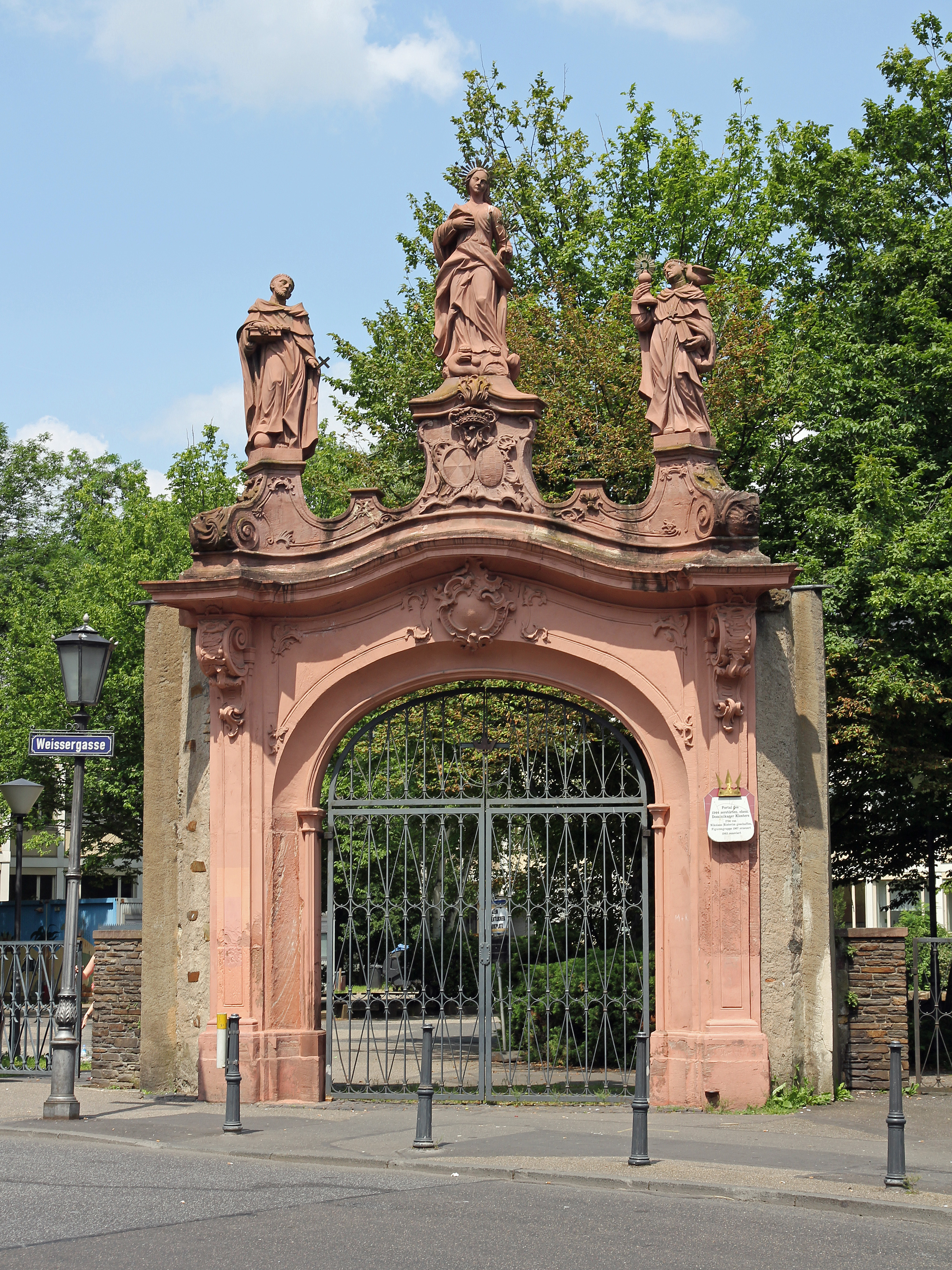
Only the Rococoportal remains to mark the grave of Archbishop Henrik Kalteisen and the Shrine of St. Olav.

But Kalteisen refused to put his position to the mercy of the King. He did agree to go to Rome and ask the Pope but he did not leave immediately. In the winter of 1453 and 1454, he was still in Norway, living in Marstrand (which did not become Swedish until 1658). In the summer of 1454 he went back to Copenhagen, where he had to appear before the Royal Council to account for his administration. He was put under enormous pressure to resign not only his office but also to propose to the Pope that he should return to Norway as the Papal legate and negotiate on his behalf the compensation for Marcellus. So Kalteisen personally went back to Rome and asked the Pope for the permission to resign. He told him that he had not been useful to the Church in Norway. He could not speak the Norwegian language and adapt to the Norwegian ways of everyday life, and his health was also suffering. The Pope refused the request but he sent him as a Kreuzzugsprediger [ German, "crusade preacher" ] with the rank of Papal legate to Germany to encourage a crusade against the Ottoman Turks.

== Resignation and Last Years ==
In 1456 King Christian complained to the new Pope, Calixtus III that the Archbishop was a weak and sickly foreigner who would not speak the language and that he had refused the royal request to resign. This had led to unrest so great in the country that even Bishop Thorleiv Olafsson was murdered in Bergen. It ceased after 7 June 1458, when the Pope decided to accept the request for the resignation and appointed Olav Trondsson as the new Archbishop of Nidaros. Kalteisen was appointed in June in the same year as the Titular Archbishop of Caesarea in Cappadocia and received a pension of 200 Rhenish florins, to be paid every six months.

In 1463 Kalteisen returned to the now destroyed Dominican monastery (Note: Today, all that remains of the Dominican monastery of Koblenz is the Rokokoportal ( "Rococo Portal" ), which guards the park in the Altstadt ( "Old City" ) neighborhood. Opened in 1233 on Weißergasse ( "White Alley" ), the oldest Dominican monastery in the Rhineland was closed in 1802 by the order of Napoleon when he and his Grande Armée invaded Koblenz. Its buildings did survive various fires, the Reformation, the Thirty Years War, the Napoleonic Wars and World War II but it did not survive the bulldozers in 1955. Only the gate, built in 1754, remains. See (in German) Harald Rausch, "Das Ende der Weißergasse", PAPOO, posted 2 Feb 2011, and (in German) Reinhard Schmid, "Koblenz - Dominikanerkloster", Klöster und Stifte in Rheinland-Pfalz [ Monasteries and Churches in Rhineland-Palatinate ] for more details.) in Koblenz, where he died in the following year, on 2 October 1464. He was buried in the monastery church in front of the altar of St. Olav, which he himself had installed.

== Bibliography ==
- (in Danish and Latin) Henrik Kalteisen, author, and Alexander Bugge, editor, Erkebiskop Henrik Kalteisens Kopibog [ Archbishop Henrik Kalteisen's Copybook ] ( Christiana ( now Oslo ) : Thronsen & Co. Bogtrykkeri [ Publications ], 1899 )
- (in Norwegian) Audun Dybdahl, "Henrik Kalteisen", in: Norsk biografisk leksikon [ Norwegian Biographical Dictionary ], retrieved 24 October 2011.
- (in German) Paul-Gundolf Gieraths, "Kalteisen, Heinrich" in: Neue Deutsche Biographie [ New German Biography ] ( NDB ), Band [ Volume ] 11 ( Berlin : Duncker & Humblot, 1977 ), ISBN 3-428-00192-3, pages 71 ff. ( Digitalized )
- Janus Møller Jensen, Denmark and the Crusades: 1400 – 1650 ( Leiden : Koninklijke Brill NV, 2007 ), ISBN 978-90-04-15579-4, pages 70 ff.
- (in Danish) Joh[anne]s. [Peder] Lindbæk, Pavernes Forhold til Danmark under Kongerne Kristiern I og Hans [ Denmark's Relationship with the Popes under Kings Christian I and John ] ( Copenhagen : Nielsen & Lydiche, 1907), pages 13-53.
- (in Norwegian) Lars Hamre, “Unionstiden 1450 – 1523 [ Union Years, 1450-1523 ]", in: Arne Fjellbu and Bernt C. Lange, editors, Nidaros erkebispestol og bispesete: 1153-1953, band I [ The Archdiocese of Nidaros and the Bishops, Volume 1 ] ( Oslo : Forlagt Land og Kirke [ State and Church Publishers ], 1955), pages 453–531.
- (in Norwegian) Olav Martinsen, "Henrik Kalteisen (1452–1458)", in: Den Katolske Kirke [ The Catholic Church [ of Norway ] ], retrieved 24 October 2011.
- (in German) Karl Werner, Kalteisen, Heinrich, in: Allgemeine Deutsche Biographie [ Complete German Biography ] ( ADB ). Band 15, ( Leipzig : Duncker & Humblot, 1882 ), page 41.
- Thomas B[enjamin]. Willson, History of the Church and State in Norway from the Tenth Century to the Sixteenth Century ( Westminster : Archibald Constable & Co., Ltd., 1903 ), pages 280–285.
