= Olav Engelbrektsson =

28th Archbishop of Norway

- Archbishop of Nidaros
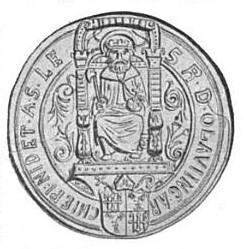
- Olav Engelbrektsson's seal from 1527.
- Church: Roman Catholic
- Archdiocese: Nidaros
- Elected: 30 May 1523
- Installed: December 1523
- Quashed: 1 April 1537
- Predecessor: Erik Valkendorf
- Successor: Archdiocese abolished Torbjørn Bratt (Lutheran superintendent)

Orders
- Consecration: 9 December 1523 by Pope Clement VII

Personal details
- Born: c. 1480 Trondenes, Norway, Kalmar Union
- Died: 7 February 1538 (aged 57–58) Lier, Duchy of Brabant, Habsburg Netherlands
- Buried: Church of Saint Gummarus
- Residence: Archbishop's Palace, Nidaros
- Education: University of Rostock
- Coat of arms

Olav Engelbrektsson (c. 1480, Trondenes, Norway – 7 February 1538, Lier, Duchy of Brabant, Habsburg Netherlands) was the 28th Archbishop of Norway from 1523 to 1537, the Regent of Norway from 1533 to 1537, a member and later president of the Riksråd (Council of the Realm), and a member of the Norwegian nobility. He was the last Roman Catholic to be the Archbishop of Norway before he fled to exile in 1537.

After his death, Olav Engelbrektsson was given a "bad reputation as an untrustworthy and scheming prelate" (dårlig ettermæle som en upålitelig og intrigant prelat) by the Protestant historians. His reputation did not improve after 1814, when Norway made its declaration of independence from Denmark, because he was still blamed for promoting the Catholic Church at the expense of Norwegian independence. But the later historians—Absalon Taranger in 1917, Sverre Steen in 1935 and Lars Hamre in 1998—have rehabilitated most of his reputation with detailed studies and labeled most of the accusations as unfair.

== Background ==
Olav Engelbrektsson is believed to have been born at Trondenes near Harstad in Troms around 1480 as the son of Engelbrekt Gunnarsson and Jorunn. Engelbrekt Gunnarson was a bondefører (a leader of farmers) and storbonde (a large landowner) in Romerike in Eastern Norway around 1447. He kept getting in arguments and fights with the Danish bailiff Lasse Skjold and eventually killed him. Researchers believe that that is why Engelbrekt and Jorunn moved to Trondenes, where his son Aslak was already living because, at that time, Aslak was the wealthiest man between Bergen and Senja. Young Olav was raised in a home that was always opposing the Danish overseers, and that might have been one of the several influences of his attitude towards the Danes in his years as the archbishop.

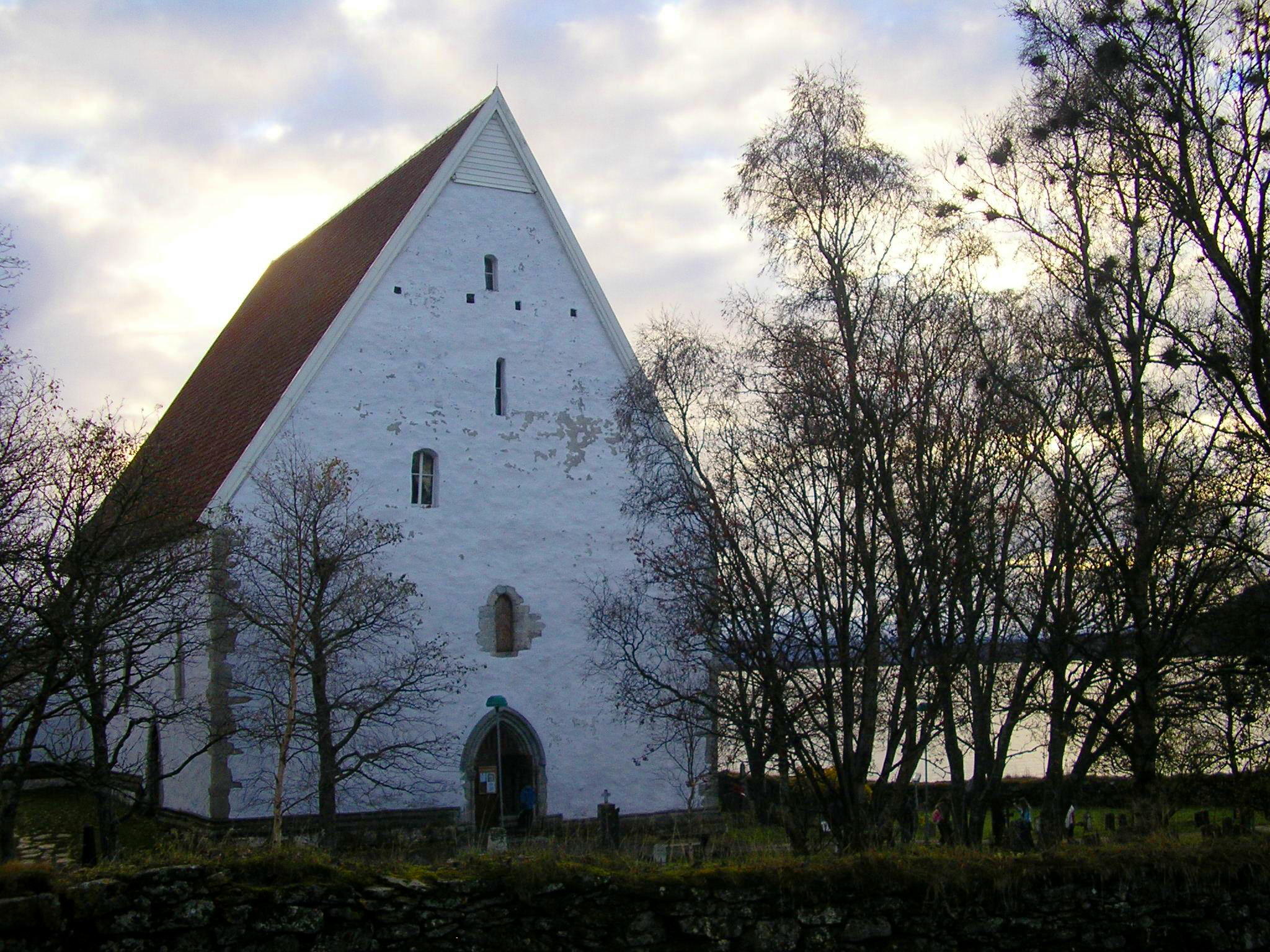
Trondenes church. Trondenes was an important parish in North Norway long before the arrival of Olav Engelbrektsson's family.

Olav Engelbrektsson was from an old landowning family in Romerike, and it is often claimed that he and his family belonged to the gentry. King Christian I of Denmark was supposed to have ennobled Engelbrekt Gunnarson and his descendants sometime before 1480 but, in 1961, cand. philol. Trygve Lysaker wrote that the documentation did not exist to such a claim. Nevertheless, the family had a coat of arms—a blue shield showing a red rose surrounded by three lilies.

Five of Olav's relatives belonged to the clergy. Two of them were his paternal uncles Sakse Gunnarsson and Gunnar Gunnarson. Gunnar was a canon in Oslo, a profession that even some of his own sons chose. It is known that Olav and four of these relatives studied at foreign universities. His uncle Sakse was the one who gave Olav clerical education.

There is a prevailing theory among the Norwegian genealogists that Olav Engelbrektsson was not the first member of his family to be the Archbishop of Nidaros. But, throughout his life, the records were more concerned with the church, the politics and the wars than with the families. So there may not be enough evidence to prove that Olav was the grandnephew of the 25th Archbishop Olav Trondsson, the nephew of the 26th Archbishop Gaute Ivarsson and the uncle of his own successor, Torbjørn Olavssøn Bratt, the first Lutheran "superintendent" of Trondheim. He did help with the education and careers of Torbjørn and his brother, Jens Olavssøn Bratt, but their biographies at Norsk Biografisk Leksikon do not name him as their uncle. It is the same with the possibility that Olav's mother might be the daughter of Ivar Trondsson from the Aspa family in Frei in Nordmøre.

== Education ==
Olav Engelbrektsson was enrolled in 1503 at the University of Rostock in Germany, which at that time had between 400 and 500 students. He was already ordained as a priest but he wanted to continue his studies. He eventually took examinations to earn several more degrees at the university—a baccalaureus in 1505 and a Magister's degree in 1507. At the university, theology was being taught by conservatives from the Catholic Church but the city of Rostock was once the center of North German humanism. There were several reformists who came to the university as guest speakers over the years but, when Olav was a student there, the regular teaching was left to the conservatives because the department of theology was led by a deputy commissioner of the business of papal indulgences of the city.

Olav Engelbrektsson soon became the leader of the Norwegian Collegiate Club, called Regentia Sancti Olavi (Senate of St. Olav) in the memory of the martyred King of Norway, Olav the Holy. They were located in a separate building under the Norwegian name of St. Olavs hus (House of St. Olav). Among the students, Engelbrektsson was known as a very sociable person, but not particularly charismatic, and he was not the one who usually followed the ways and beliefs of the club. He became acquainted with, among others, the brothers from Sweden, Johannes Magnus and Olaus Magnus. The brothers would be the last two Catholics to be the Archbishop of Uppsala, but Olaus is still famous for his map of Scandinavia, the Carta Marina of 1537. Engelbrektsson were especially good friends with another Swede, Laurentius Andreae, the archdeacon of Uppsala who quickly became one of the leaders of the Protestant Reformation of Sweden under Gustavus Vasa. By 1515, Olav Engelbrektsson had been at the university for eleven years and had even taught for his own studies, including a brief period at the Catholic University of Louvain. But in 1515 he decided that it was the time to return to his homeland.

== The dean of Nidaros ==
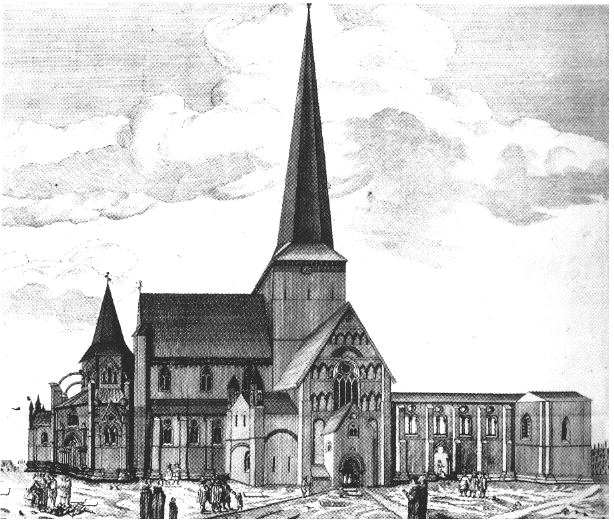
Nidaros Cathedral was the spiritual center of Norway during the Middle Ages. Engraving by Jacob Maschius, 1661

When he returned to Norway, Olav Engelbrektsson was briefly mentioned as a canon in Oslo but, by 10 May 1515, he was already in Nidaros (now Trondheim) as a canon. Seven months later, on 17 December 1515, he was promoted to the dean of Nidaros, with a papal dispensation from Pope Leo X to succeed the late Peter Jonsson Stut. Although he was only thirty years old at that time, Olav became the second most important member in the Cathedral Chapter, next to the archbishop of Nidaros, the Dane Erik Walkendorf. Walkendorf had been appointed to his post in 1510 by King Christian II of Denmark and Norway without any consultation or recommendations from the cathedral chapter.

Olav Engelbrektsson was responsible for the production of the sermons in the Nidaros Cathedral and probably sat on the editorial staff of the book for the Mass at the cathedral, the Missale Nidrosiense (Latin, Missal of Nidaros), the first book printed in the Norwegian language. Along with the cantor Peter Sigurdsson, Archbishop Walkendorf had the missal printed in Copenhagen in 1519. According to the church historian Oluf Kolsrud, it is "with his careful treatment of the Latin text, the excellent proof of Olav's learning" (med sin omhyggelige behandling av den latinske tekstform et ypperlig bevis for Olavs lærdom). A few years later, another book of liturgy was also published for Nidaros with the title of the Breviarium Nidrosiense (Latin, "Breviary of Niadros"). Olav was on good terms with Walkendorf and became his representative, i.e., the head of the ecclesiastical proceedings within the Archdiocese. It also appears that he was also the Archbishop's economist and accountant.

When Walkendorf fled from the tyranny of King Christian II in 1521, the authority of the Archdiocese went to the Cathedral Chapter, whose chairman was Olav Engelbrektsson. Account books, the Register paa Sancta Oluffa Ioerdher (a register of properties, circa 1533) and extensive building activities suggests that Olaf was a "talented and versatile administrator" (dyktig og allsidig administrator) according to historian Øystein Rian. Olav Engelbrektsson began the complete reconstruction of the Archbishop's Palace, whose hall in the north wing and parts of the west wing had been destroyed by the Danish troops in 1532.

== The archbishop of Nidaros ==
=== The beginning ===
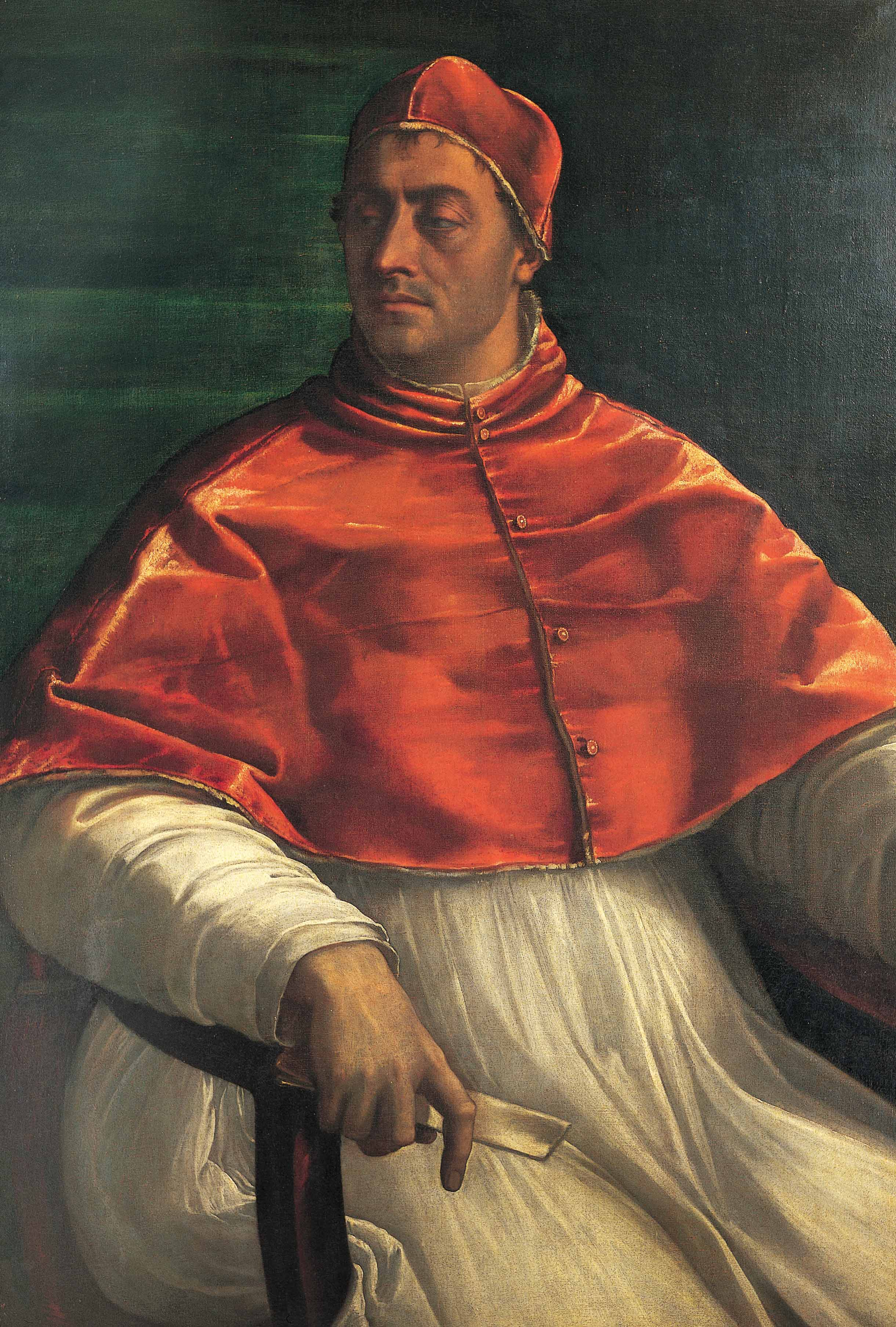
Pope Clement VII

In 1522, the news came to Nidaros that Walkendorf had died in Rome. The Cathedral Chapter then unanimously elected on 13 April 1522 Olav Engelbrektsson as the new Archbishop of Nidaros, and he therefore went to Rome for his pallium. Just over a month before the election, King Christian II had fled to the Habsburg Netherlands after the nobles revolted with the help from the Duchy of Schleswig - Holstein. This was known to the Cathedral Chapter when Olav Engelbrektsson was chosen because it still had to send a letter to the King for his approval of the election. On his way to Rome, Olav stopped in Mechelen, Flanders, for a visit with the King, who had been living in exile in the Duchy of Burgundy, because Christian II was still legally the King of Norway. Olav hailed the King, pledged his allegiance to him and delivered the Cathedral Chapter's letter to him. He left with the King's approval.

However, for his pallium, Olav had to wait in Rome for the election of the next Pope because Adrian VI had just died on 14 September 1523. During his stay, Olav met the Bavarian scholar, Jacob Ziegler, and gave him the information that went into Ziegler's major treatise of geography, Schondia, published in Strasbourg in 1532. Engelbrektsson's statements about his homeland showed his deep sense of nationalism and his distrust of the Danish officials who had been oppressing his homeland. When Giulio de' Medici was elected as Pope Clement VII on 19 November 1523, Olav could finally have his pallium and go home. He was consecrated as the Archbishop of Nidaros by the new Pope in December 1523. On Christmas Day, Olav left Rome for home.

Engelbrektsson probably would not have been the Archbishop of Nidaros, had the King of Denmark had the complete control of Norway. But the situation was left unsettled when Christian II fled to exile and Frederick I would not be legally elected by the Riksråd of Norway as the next King of Norway until 1524.

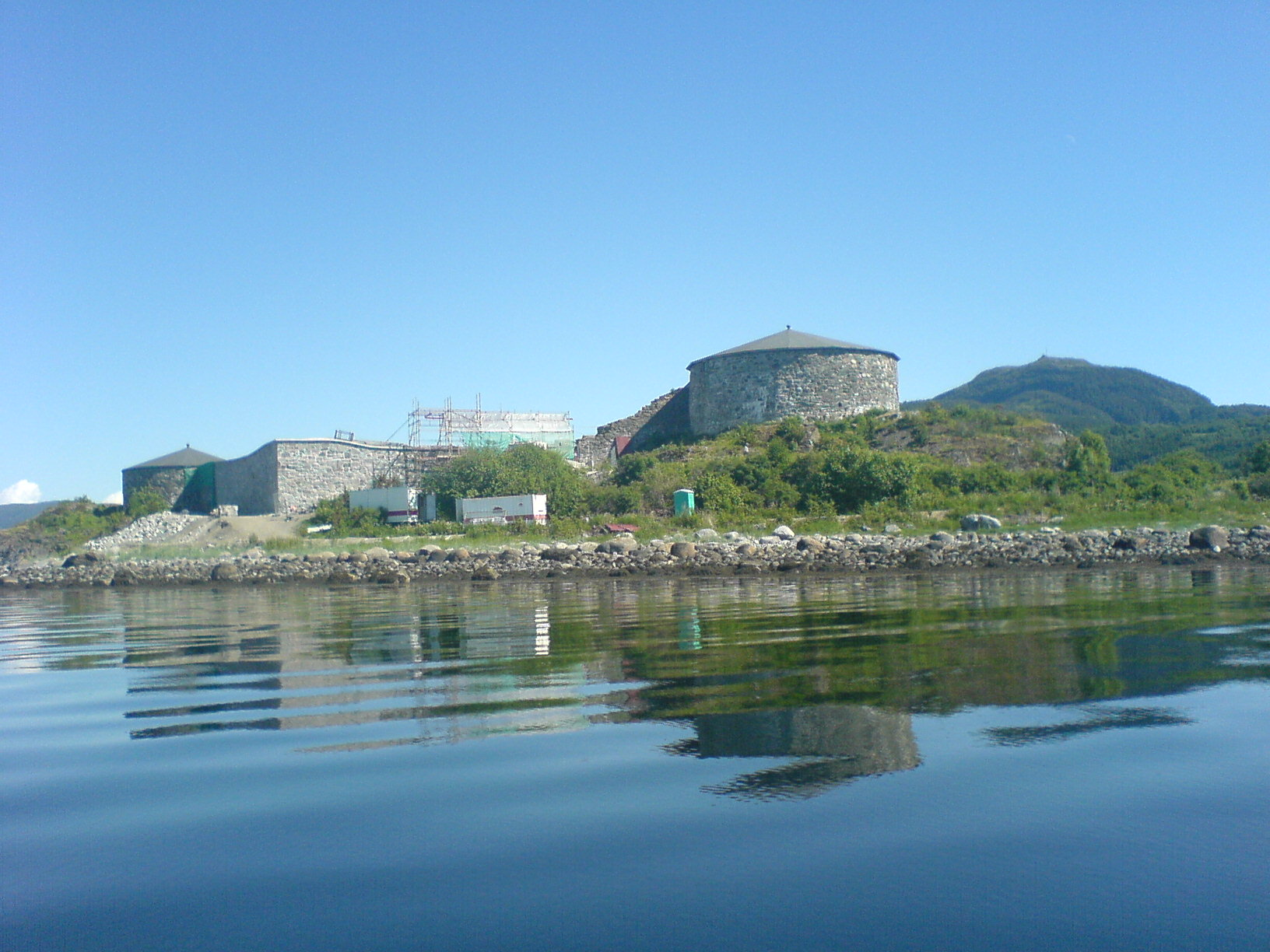
Steinvikholm Castle, outside of Trondheim, where Olav lived.

=== Riksråd Assembly of 1524 ===
As the new Archbishop of Nidaros, Engelbrektsson automatically gained a seat in the Riksråd. So he was present at the national meeting in Bergen in August 1524, when the councilors built an agreement, which Frederick would have to accept and sign if he wished to be the King of Norway. According to the historian Audun Dybdahl, it was a mere formality, delaying the coronation. First and foremost, Norway was to be an equal partner with Denmark in their union, with its administration to be done by its own National Council and the same Council was to have the say and consent in the matters of national taxation and foreign policies. Moreover, the laws and church of Norway were to be respected and all the documents of the Norwegian archives were to be returned to Norway, and the king was to help in regaining all the lands Norway had lost under the previous Kings. There were also many conditions that strengthened the power and privileges of the local nobility and clergy. It is not clear who was the main mover behind the politics during the meeting—Vincens Lunge or Olav Engelbrektsson. Lunge and Henrik Krummedike had originally been sent to Norway as its rikshovmeisters (Lord High Stewards).

The politics of the Riksråd were influenced by the conditions inspired by the previous changes in the Throne of Denmark and the national wishes and needs matched the attitudes and beliefs of Olav Engelbrektsson. The results were outlined in a meeting between the Archbishop, the Bishop of Hamar (Mogens Lauritssøn) and the notables from Østlandet (Eastern Norway) in May 1524. Before that meeting, Olav was able to secure the royal approval of the eventual agreement from King Frederick with the help of Mogens, who had gone to Copenhagen for the negotiations with the king.

Afterwards, on 5 August 1524, the Riksråd elected Frederick as the new King of Norway and swore its allegiance to him. Two days later, in Copenhagen, he was crowned as the King of Denmark and Norway. But he never went to Nidaros to be formally crowned as the King of Norway. But Engelbrektsson did not trust him. He constantly worked to keep Nidaros from holding the coronation of Frederick as the King of Norway and he managed to delay it three times. The Archbishop wanted Christian II, the King's nephew, to return as the King of Norway.

=== The struggles of the archbishop ===
For the next twelve years until 1536, Olav Engelbrektsson was virtually the leader of Norway, serving as the defender of the Catholic faith against the hordes of the Reformation, while his cousin, Admiral Kristoffer Trondson handled the military defenses for him. As the Archbishop, Olav built the Steinvikholm Castle outside Trondheim.

But the Catholic Church was not the only concern of the Archbishop. He also constantly tried to break Norway away from the bonds that bound her to Denmark but he constantly failed. His failures paved the way for the submission of Norway to the Danish crown, marking the end of both Norwegian independence and Catholicism.

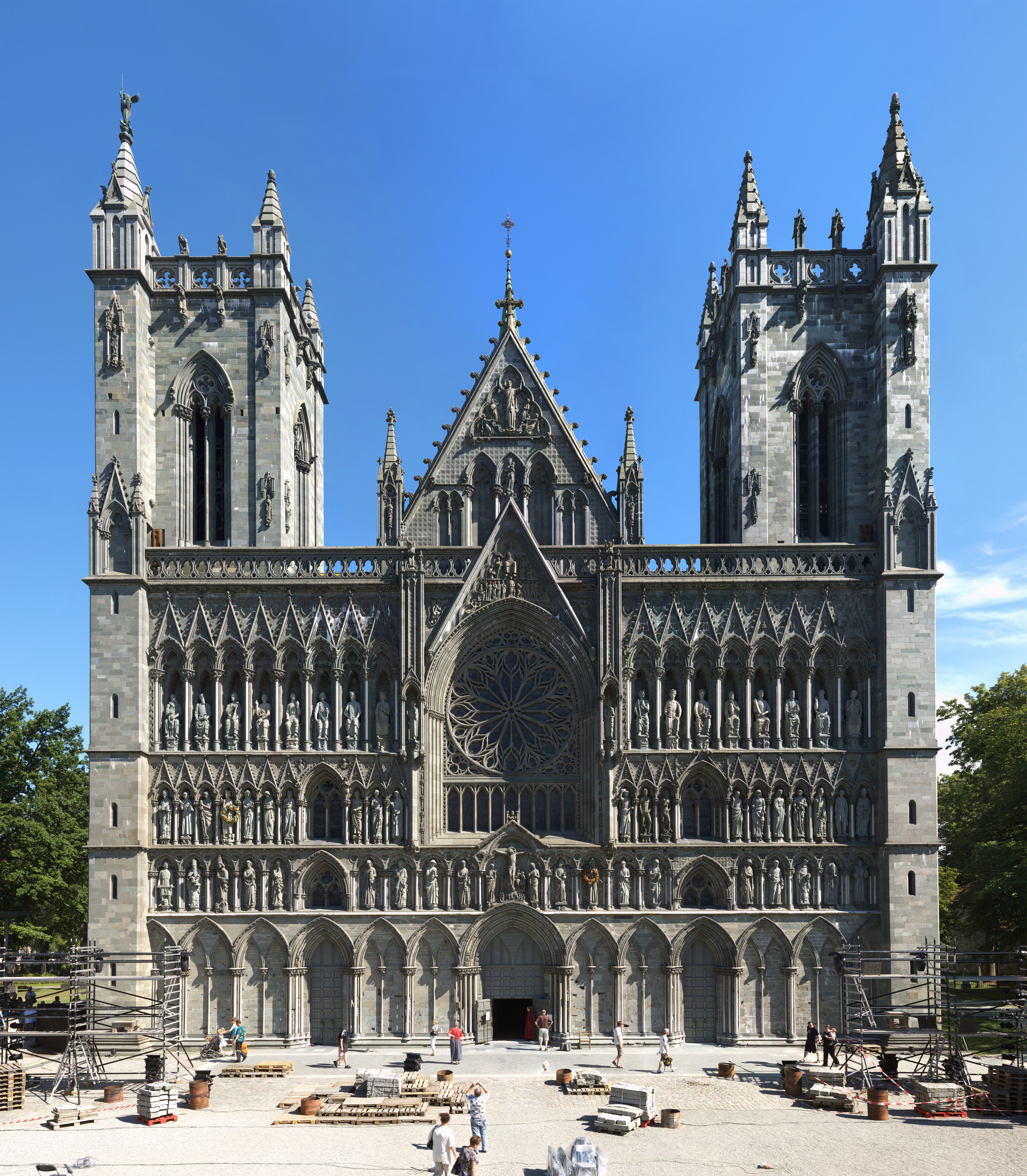
Nidaros Cathedral.

=== The feud with Vincens Lunge ===
The impetuosity and recklessness in the implementation of the policy in Bergen after the election, is most often been attributed to Vincens Lunge. From 1524 to 1525 he pushed partly to have Henrik Krummedike deprived of all his Norwegian len, and partly to give the Akershus Castle to Oluf Galle, both in defiance of the wishes of the King. In Denmark, Lunge was believed to be the man behind the more aggressive policies, while the archbishop was seen as more deliberate.

Øystein Rian believes that Olaf Engelbrektsson's official actions in the years between 1524 and 1528 indicate that he was a supporter of a careful line (forsktig linje). His position as the head of the Riksråd was weakened by Vincent Lunge's headstrong line. However, it was still strengthened by the fact that Lunge was still the King's governor in the fjords of North Norway. According to Rian, King Frederick and the Royal Council of Denmark knew the difference between the boldness of Lunge and the forbearance of others. Lunge also weakened the Norwegian cooperation by going after the properties of other noble families, directly challenging them. He also interfered with their disputes over their inheritances. Olav Engelbrektsson even began to be suspicious when Lunge expressed his sympathy for the teachings of Martin Luther and others, which had also made enemies out of the Bishop of Bergen, Olav Torkelsson, and the Bishop of Stavanger, Hoskuld Hoskuldsson.

Lunge added fire to the enmity in Bergen, then the second largest city in Norway, by razing several ecclesiastical buildings to the ground, by allowing the Lutherans to stay in the city in 1526, and by bringing two Lutheran preachers to preach in the city's churches in 1529. These preachers had their letters of protection from the King himself and the King also secularized, in the same year, the Nonneseter Monastery in Bergen. He offered it to Lunge and he accepted it, turning it into his personal (and fortified) residence, Lungegården.

The Archbishop was furious at the actions of Lunge. He went out in the open against him and his mother-in-law, Inger Ottesdotter Romer (Lady Inger of Austrått), by ordering the looting of Austrått and seizing the control of its associated properties, while Lady Inger fled to Bergen. Engelbrektsson had been promised support from Christian II's brother-in-law, Emperor Charles V of the Holy Roman Empire, but the support did not materialize. The Archbishop was forced to make a new oath of allegiance to Frederick I, pay the compensation and make peace with Vincens Lunge and Lady Inger.

=== The feud with the two kings ===
In March 1532, Engelbrektsson was recorded as paying 46.3 lbs (21 kg) of silver, in minter form, to mercenaries hired by Christian II during his unsuccessful struggle against Frederick I for the throne of Denmark and Norway. When Christian lost the war in July, Archbishop Engelbrektsson was fined heavily for his support with the amount of 15,000 Danish marks, the equivalent of about 295.4 lbs (134 kg) of silver, to be paid in three installments.

The 1533 accession of the new King of Denmark, Christian III, escalated the political situation; here was a king who was serious not only about bringing Norway into the Kingdom of Denmark but also bringing the Protestant Reformation to Norway. For Engelbrektsson as the representative of the Holy See in Norway, the news were naturally not welcome. As his response, he tried to formalize Norwegian sovereignty and independence at a meeting of the Norwegian Privy Council at Bud but failed.

=== The murder of Vincens Lunge ===
Tensions rose in 1536, when the Danish Privy Council declared Norway to be the province of the Kingdom of Denmark. Vincens Lunge was sent back to Norway as the rikshovmeister (Lord High Steward) to enforce the annexation. The response was not friendly; he was murdered by followers of Olav. The actual murder of Lunge was said to have taken place at the hands of Engelbrektsson's cousin, Admiral Kristoffer Trondson, Norway's military commander who had been fighting against Danish ships with the funds mostly from the Netherlands.

=== Exile and death ===
In 1536, Olav fled Steinvikholm Castle to Nidarholm Abbey on Munkholmen (Norwegian, "Monk's Isle"), a small island just outside Trondheim, and spent the winter there.

In the following spring, on 3 May 1537, Mary of Austria, the governor of the Netherlands at that time, agreed to a truce of three years with Christian III. One of the paragraphs of the agreement specifically referred to Olav Engelbrektsson, allowing him the possibility of emigration to any country of his choice with his personal belongings. If he was already in captivity, he was to be freed immediately. But, by then, he had already been in the Habsburg Netherlands for two days.

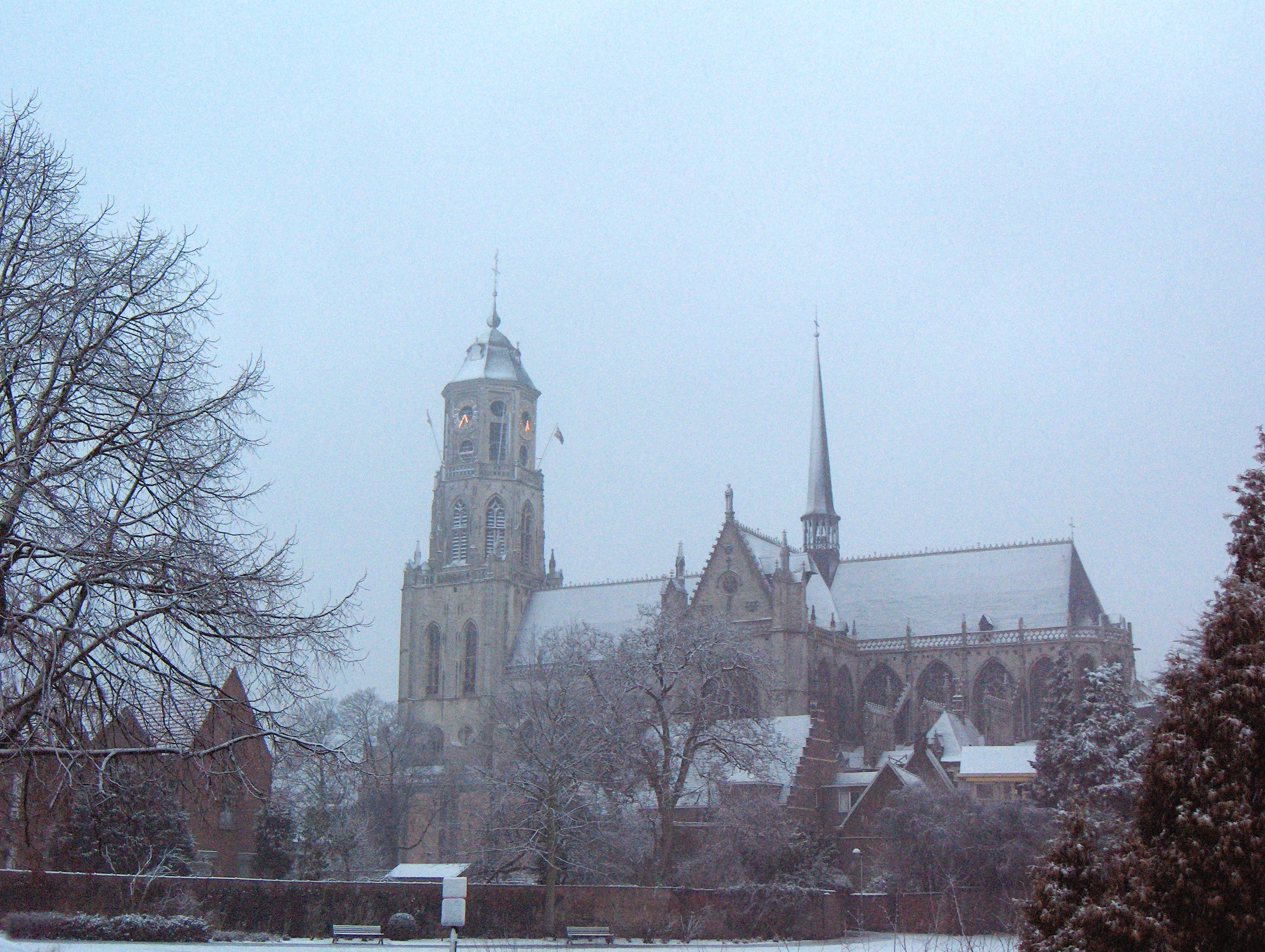
The Church of St. Gommaire in the winter

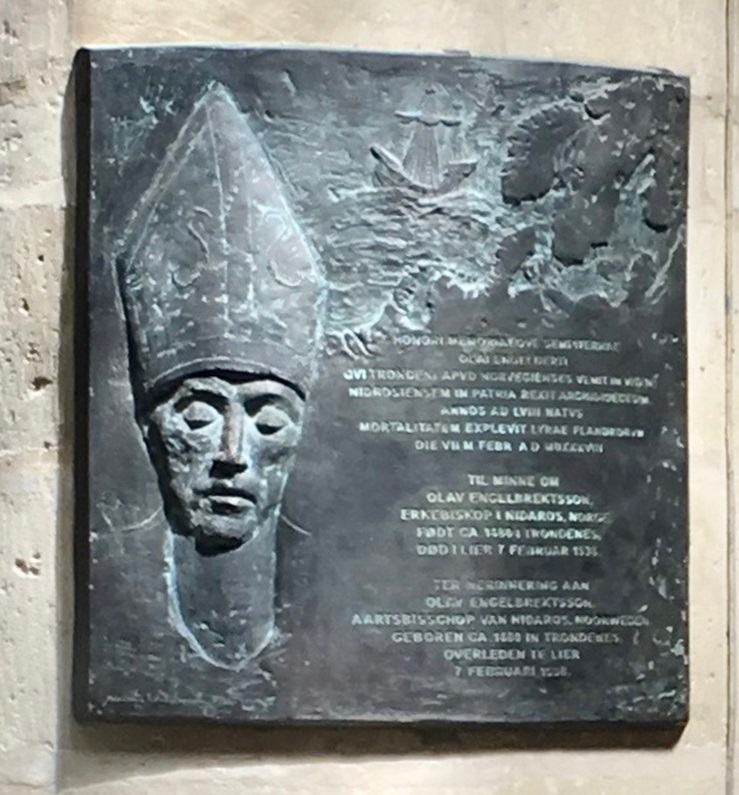
Memorial plaque in St. Gommaire

The Archbishop had waited as long as he could to leave Norway. His last act as the archbishop of Nidaros was the consecration of Sigmundur Eyjólfsson of Iceland as the Bishop of Skálholt on Palm Sunday, 25 March 1537, in the ruins of the Cathedral of Nidaros. A week later, on Easter Sunday, 1 April 1537, the Archbishop left Nidaros with 60 followers. He took the archives of the archdiocese, including the Register paa Sancta Oluffa Ioerdher, with him. but he left behind St. Olav's shrine and other valuables. However, he was saddled (possibly unfairly) with the reputation of having looted the Nidaros Cathedral. After his death, his archives went to the Louis V, the Elector of the Palatinate, in Heidelberg and later to the Bavarian Royal Archives in Munich but in 1830 they were returned to Norway.

On 1 May 1537, the Archbishop and his entourage arrived at Enkhuizen, a port of the Duchy of Burgundy, to a hearty welcome. They were assigned to Lierre (now Lier, Belgium) in the Duchy of Brabant, where he died on 6 February 1538. He is buried under the high altar of the Church of Saint Gommaire in Lierre. His grave is marked by a plaque, unveiled on 21 May 2003 by Queen Sonja of Norway on her official visit to Belgium and made by a resident of Trondheim, Marit Wiklund.

== Legacy ==
=== A Midnight Opera ===
The drama of the Olav Engelbrektsson saga, including the violent murder of Niels Lykke, is reenacted in a modern opera in Trondheim. The murder of Nils Lykke is dramatized with a song. Created in 1993, the opera has been ongoing since 2009; it is held biannually on the premises of the Steinvikholm Castle in the evenings during the summer. But it is held only every two years to protect the condition of the grounds of the ancient castle. The opera was originally funded with grants from the Norwegian Ministry of Culture.

=== Vodka in Norway ===
Engelbrektsson introduced vodka to Norway as a universal remedy and drink. In 1531, he was given a package, with the letter dated 13 April 1531, from Eske Bille, then the rikshovmeister at the Bergenhus Fortress. Bille wrote in his letter that the package contained "some water . . . which is called Aqua vite and helps the same water for all his illness that a man can have internally and externally" (nogit watn . . . som kallis Aqua vite och hielper szamme watn for alle hande kranchdom som ith menniske kandt haffue indwortis). At that time, Aqua vitae (Latin, "water of life") was the common name of vodka. The letter is the earliest known mention of either vodka or akvavit in Scandinavia. The supplied alcohol probably came from Denmark, where it was already quite popular. Perhaps at that time Engelbrektsson began to produce vodka in Nidaros.

Olav Engelbrektsson Born: 1480 Died: 7 February 1538
Religious titles
Preceded by Erik Valkendorf	Archbishop of Nidaros; 1523-1537	Abolished in Reformation Torbjørn Bratt became the first Protestant Bishop of the new Diocese of Nidaros
Regnal titles
Preceded by Frederick I as King of Norway	Regent of Norway; 1533–1537	Succeeded by Christian III as King of Norway
