= David Bolt =

David Bolt may refer to:

- David Bolt (bowls) (born 1973), English bowls international
- David Bolt (civil servant), Independent Chief Inspector of Borders and Immigration
- David Bolt (disability studies), British professor of disability studies
- David Bolt (novelist) (1927–2012), English novelist
- David Bolt (politician), Australian politician
- David Bolt, mayor of Lakeview Heights, Kentucky
- David Bolt, founder of Bolteløkka in St. Hanshaugen, Oslo, Norway
