= Arne Einarsson Vade =

- Archbishop of Nidaros; 1346–1349
- Church: Roman Catholic
- Archdiocese: Nidaros
- Appointed: 30 Aug 1346
- Term ended: 1349
- Predecessor: Pål Bårdsson
- Successor: Olav

Orders
- Consecration: 1346

Personal details
- Born: c. 1300
- Died: 17 October 1349 (aged 48–49) Nidaros, Norway

Arne Einarsson Vade (c. 1300 – after 17 October 1349) was a 14th-century Norwegian priest who served as Archbishop of Nidaros.

His parents were Einar and Ingebjørg Arnesdatter.

He served as archbishop of Nidaros from 1346 to 1349.
