= Hallvard Graatop =

Norwegian farmer

Hallvard Graatop was a 15th-century Norwegian rebel leader who fought against Erik of Pomerania. The name "Graatop", meaning "Gray-top" is probably a nom de guerre, possibly referring to gray hair or a gray hood (as a wanted outlaw, he may have concealed his face). Graatop's true identity is unknown. Popular stories in the Telemark area claim him to be "Lord" Hallvard Torbjørnsen of Roaldstad (later known as Vrålstad) farm.

== Causes of the conflict ==
The Black Death, which wrought havoc throughout Europe during the 14th century, had decimated the ruling families of Scandinavia. King Olav of Denmark and Norway was the last native ruler in Scandinavia. When he died in 1387, his mother Margareta took over the rule of those two countries and then Sweden as well. In 1397 in the town of Kalmar in Sweden, the Union of the three lands under a single crown was made official and Erik of Pomerania was chosen as king. Erik fatefully chose to govern the three kingdoms from Denmark using the Danish aristocracy.

The Danish aristocracy naturally saw to their best interests and slowly alienated the residents of Sweden and Norway whom they tried to rule. In Sweden Engelbrekt Engelbrektson led a successful rebellion in 1434. In 1436 Amund Sigurdsson Bolt tried to do the same in Norway, but failed. Enter Hallvard Graatop. He raised an army of peasants to challenge the harsh Danish rule in Oslo. Hallvard and his army of Norwegians fought the Danes in 1438, but failed to secure their freedom. This third rebellion in under a decade, however, led the Danish aristocracy to turn on King Erik, whose harsh policies had fomented the disdain in which Danes were now held by their northern neighbors. They saw to the ouster of King Erik in 1439. In 1442 the Swedes were officially regranted sovereignty, however, the Danish aristocracy was unwilling to give up Norway. The next decade saw them reconquer the country and annex outright the Norwegian colonies of Greenland, Iceland, and the Faroes.

== Controversy ==
The identity of Hallvard Graatop has been disputed by more modern scholars. Some claim the connection to a Hallvard Torbjornsson or Toresson living at the Vraalstad farm in Drangedal in the 15th century is entirely based upon hearsay and speculation. As a rebel leader, he would certainly have been executed by his adversaries if caught, thus it's quite reasonable that he deliberately covered his tracks. It seems that he was successful in this respect, as there's no record of his execution.

== Notes and references ==
- Voxland, Melvin Voxland Viking Saga, 1980.
- Naeseth, Gerhard Wrolstad Family History, 1978.
