= Torbjørn Bratt =

Norwegian clergyman

- Born: c. 1502; Andenes, Norway
- Died: 1548 (aged 45–46)
- Education: University of Cologne
- Occupations: Clergyman, Bishop of the Diocese of Trondhjem

Torbjørn Olavssøn Bratt (c. 1502 – 1548) was a Norwegian clergyman. He was the first bishop of Trondheim, after the introduction of the Protestant Reformation in Norway. He served as Bishop of the Diocese of Trondhjem from 1546 until 1548.

Bratt was born in the fishing village of Andenes on the island of Andøya in Nordland, Norway. He was born into one of the families that constituted the remains of old Norwegian aristocracy and was elder brother of Jens Olavssøn Bratt. He and his brother were both enrolled at the University of Cologne thanks to the sponsorship of Olav Engelbrektsson, Archbishop of Trondheim. Engelbrektsson was the last Roman Catholic to be the archbishop before he fled to exile in 1537. After the archbishop had to flee, both brothers adapted to the situation and cooperated with the new Lutheran authorities. In 1530, he returned to Copenhagen where he completed his master's degree. For a short time, he held a teaching position at the University of Copenhagen. In 1546, Bratt was appointed superintendent (Decanus capituli). He was assigned Elgeseter cloister as a residence. In his new position, he began with a transformation of the Trondheim Cathedral School to an evangelical seminary for Lutheran priests. He died of the plague at the age of about 45 years in 1548.

Church of Norway titles
Preceded by Olav Engelbrektsson as the Last Catholic Bishop (Protestant reformation in Norway)	Bishop of Trondhjem; 1546 –1548	Succeeded by Hans Gaas
