= Liverpool University Press =

British publisher

- Parent company: University of Liverpool
- Founded: 1899
- Founder: John Sampson (linguist)
- Country of origin: United Kingdom
- Headquarters location: Liverpool
- Distribution: Wiley (UK and most of world); Longleaf (Americas); Ta Tong Book Company (Taiwan); Overleaf (India)
- Publication types: Books, academic journals
- Imprints: Liverpool University Press, Modern Languages Open, Pavilion Poetry
- No. of employees: 33
- Official website: www.liverpooluniversitypress.co.uk

Liverpool University Press (LUP), founded in 1899, is the third oldest university press in England after Oxford University Press and Cambridge University Press. As the press of the University of Liverpool, it specialises in modern languages, literatures, history, and visual culture and currently publishes more than 160 books a year, as well as 50 academic journals. LUP's books are distributed in North America by Longleaf.

== History ==
One of the earliest heads of LUP was Lascelles Abercrombie, the first poetry lecturer at the university.. Across its history a number of distinguished scholars have published with the Press, including the Nobel Prize winner Ronald Ross and the literary critic Hermione Lee.

In 2004, the Press was restructured, changing from a department of the University of Liverpool to a subsidiary.

Alongside its academic publishing, LUP is known for the Pavilion Poetry imprint. Inaugural poet Mona Arshi's collection, Small Hands, won The Felix Dennis Prize for Best First Collection at the 2015 Forward Prizes for Poetry. How to Wash a Heart by Bhanu Kapil won the 2020 T. S. Eliot Prize.

In 2024, the Chief Executive of Liverpool University Press, Anthony Cond, became the first President of the Association of University Presses from outside of the Americas.

== Collaborations and activities ==
Although well known for publishing under its own imprint, Liverpool University Press also provides publishing for a number of other organisations including The British Academy, Historic England and the Voltaire Foundation.

The Press has been a strong supporter of Open Access and was the first publisher to sign up to Knowledge Unlatched, a global library consortium approach to funding open access books.

In 2014, LUP launched Modern Languages Open, its peer-reviewed open access online platform publishing research from across the modern languages.

== Awards ==
Liverpool University Press has won Academic Publisher of the Year awards from both the Independent Publishers Guild and The Bookseller.

== Journals ==
Journals published by LUP include:

- Bulletin of Hispanic Studies (since 1923)
- Town Planning Review (TPR) (since 1910)
- Extrapolation (journal)
- French Studies
- The Journal of Literary & Cultural Disability Studies, an academic journal covering cultural and especially literary representations of disability, containing a wide variety of textual analyses that are informed by disability theory and, by extension, experiences of disability. It was established in 2006 and launched at the Inaugural Conference of the Cultural Disability Studies Research Network, Liverpool John Moores University, 2007. It moved to Liverpool University Press in 2009. The editor-in-chief is David Bolt (Liverpool Hope University).
- Science Fiction Film and Television (since 2008)
