= David Bolt (disability studies) =

British academic

David Bolt is the founding Editor-in-Chief of the Journal of Literary and Cultural Disability Studies and the Director of the Centre for Culture & Disability Studies at Liverpool Hope University, where he is also Professor of Disability Studies and Interdisciplinarity.

== Academic work ==
Bolt joined Liverpool Hope University in August 2009 as a lecturer in Disability Studies. He is Editor-in-Chief of the Journal of Literary and Cultural Disability Studies, founder of the International Network of Literary & Cultural Disability Scholars, and was the first Honorary Research Fellow in the Centre for Disability Research at Lancaster University.

His published works include:

=== Monographs ===
- The Metanarrative of Blindness: A Re-reading of Twentieth-Century Anglophone Writing (The University of Michigan Press, 2014, ISBN 978-0-472-11906-6).
- Cultural Disability Studies in Education: Interdisciplinary Navigations of the Normative Divide (Routledge, 2019, ISBN 978-1-138-10327-6)
- Disability Duplicity and the Formative Cultural Politics of Generation X (Routledge, 2023, ISBN 9781032553979)
- The Playground Model of Disability: Dis/honestly Tropes in Contemporary British Sociocultural Representation (Routledge, 2026, ISBN 9781041064923)
- Cultural Disability Studies in Education: Interdisciplinary Navigations of the Normative Divide, 2nd edition (Routledge, 2027, ISBN 978-1-041-24890-3)

=== Edited Collections ===
- The Madwoman and the Blindman: Jane Eyre, Discourse, Disability Eds. David Bolt, Julia Miele Rodas, & Elizabeth J. Donaldson (Ohio State University Press, 2012, ISBN 978-0-8142-5226-0)
- Changing Social Attitudes Toward Disability: Perspectives from historical, cultural, and educational studies Ed. David Bolt (Routledge, 2014 ISBN 9781138216051)
- Disability, Avoidance and the Academy: Challenging Resistance Eds. David Bolt & Claire Penketh (Routledge, 2016, ISBN 1138858668)
- Metanarratives of Disability: Culture, Assumed Authority, and the Normative Social Order Ed. David Bolt (Routledge, 2021, ISBN 9780367523190)
- Finding Blindness: International Constructions and Deconstructions Ed. David Bolt (Routledge, 2022, ISBN 9781032229928)
- Cultural Stations of Disability: A Moment in Discourse (Routledge, 2026, ISBN 978-1-032-87098-4)

=== Book Series ===
- Literary Disability Studies Book Series Eds. David Bolt, Elizabeth J. Donaldson, & Julia Miele Rodas (Palgrave Macmillan/Springer Publishing)
1. Friedrich, Patricia. The Literary and Linguistic Construction of Obsessive-Compulsive Disorder: No Ordinary Doubt (2015, New York: Palgrave Macmillan/Springer; ISBN 9781349576388)
2. Disability in Comic Books and Graphic Narratives Eds. Chris Foss, Jonathan W. Gray, & Zach Whalen (2016, Palgrave Macmillan/Springer; ISBN 9781137501110)
3. Disabling Romanticism: Body, Mind, and Text Ed. Michael Bradshaw (2016, Palgrave Macmillan/Springer; ISBN 978-1-137-46064-6)
4. Thompson, Hannah. Reviewing Blindness in French Fiction, 1789-2013 (2017, Palgrave Macmillan/Springer; ISBN 978-1-137-43511-8)
5. Tankard, Alex. Tuberculosis and Disabled Identity in Nineteenth Century Literature: Invalid Lives (2018, Palgrave Macmillan/Springer; ISBN 978-3-319-71446-2)
6. Literatures of Madness: Disability Studies and Mental Health Ed. Elizabeth J. Donaldson (2018, Palgrave Macmillan/Springer; ISBN 978-3-319-92666-7)
7. Row-Heyveld, Lindsey. Dissembling Disability in Early Modern English Drama (2018, Palgrave Macmillan/Springer; ISBN 978-3-319-92135-8)
8. Performing Disability in Early Modern English Drama Ed. Leslie C. Dunn (2020, Palgrave Macmillan/Springer; ISBN 978-3-030-57208-2)
9. Grubgeld, Elizabeth. Disability and Life Writing in Post-Independence Ireland (2020, Palgrave Macmillan/Springer; ISBN 978-3-030-37246-0)
10. Amputation in Literature and Film: Artificial Limbs, Prosthetic Relations and the Semiotics of "Loss" Eds. Erik Grayson and Maren Scheurer (2021, Palgrave Macmillan/Springer; ISBN 978-3-030-74377-2)
11. Healey, Devon. Dramatizing Blindness: Disability Studies as Critical Creative Narrative (2021, Palgrave Macmillan/Springer; ISBN 978-3-030-80811-2)
12. Introna, Arianna. Autonomist Narratives of Disability in Modern Scottish Writing: Crip Enchantments (2022, Palgrave Macmillan/Springer; ISBN 978-3-030-99273-6)
13. Haukaas, Anelise. Disability Identity in Simulation Narratives (2024, Palgrave Macmillan/Springer; ISBN 978-3-031-44482-1)
14. Placing Disability: Personal Essays of Embodied Geography Eds. Susannah B. Mintz & Gregory Fraser (2024, Palgrave Macmillan/Springer; ISBN 978-3-031-41219-6)
15. Logan-Smith, Louise. Neo-Victorian Cultural Collections of Disability: Interdisciplinary Navigations (2024, Palgrave Macmillan/Springer; ISBN 978-3-031-76092-1)
16. Irish, Bradley J. Literary Neurodiversity Studies: Current and Future Directions (2025, Palgrave Macmillan/Springer; ISBN 978-3-031-80603-2)
17. Shakespeare and Early Modern Madness Eds. Leslie C. Dunn and Avi Mendelson (2026, Palgrave Macmillan/Springer, ISBN 978-3-032-08899-4)
18. Jones, Bethan. Sight Loss and the Tethered Self in 21st Century Novels (2026, Palgrave Macmillan/Springer, ISBN 978-3-032-19871-6)
- A Cultural History of Disability General Eds. David Bolt, & Robert McRuer (2019, Bloomsbury, ISBN 9781350029538)
1. A Cultural History of Disability in Antiquity, Volume 1. Ed. Christian Laes (2020, Bloomsbury Academic; ISBN 9781350028555)
2. A Cultural History of Disability in the Middle Ages, Volume 2. Eds. Jonathan Hsy, Tory V. Pearman & Joshua R. Eyler (2020, Bloomsbury Academic; ISBN 9781350028746)
3. A Cultural History of Disability in the Renaissance, Volume 3. Eds. Susan Anderson & Liam Haydon (2020, Bloomsbury Academic; ISBN 9781350028906)
4. A Cultural History of Disability in the Long Eighteenth Century, Volume 4. Eds. D. Christopher Gabbard & Susannah B. Mintz (2020, Bloomsbury Academic; ISBN 9781350028944)
5. A Cultural History of Disability in the Long Nineteenth Century, Volume 5. Eds. Joyce L. Huff & Martha Stoddard Holmes (2020, Bloomsbury Academic; ISBN 9781350029101)
6. A Cultural History of Disability in the Modern Age, Volume 6. Eds. David T. Mitchell & Sharon L. Snyder (2020, Bloomsbury Academic; ISBN 9781350029323)
- Autocritical Disability Studies Book Series Ed. David Bolt (Routledge)
1. Metanarratives of Disability: Culture, Assumed Authority and the Normative Social Order. Ed. David Bolt (2021, Routledge; ISBN 9780367523190)
2. Finding Blindness: International Constructions and Deconstructions. Ed. David Bolt (2022, Routledge; ISBN 9781032229928)
3. Pritchard, Erin. Midgetism: The Exploitation and Discrimination of People with Dwarfism Ed. David Bolt (2023, Routledge; ISBN 9781032465944)
4. Houston, Ella. Advertising Disability Ed. David Bolt( 2024, Routledge; ISBN 9781003433415)
5. Lee, Yoon Joo. Stories on Disability Through Our Voices: Born This Way Ed. David Bolt ( 2025, Routledge; ISBN 9781032740935)
6. Barden, Owen. Learning with Learning Disability: What Learning Disability Can Teach Us About Being Human Ed. David Bolt (2026, Routledge; ISBN 9781032534138)

== Centre for Culture & Disability Studies ==
Bolt is the director of the Centre for Culture & Disability Studies (CCDS; Liverpool Hope University). The work of the CCDS is fundamentally concerned with social justice; with challenging and changing the inequalities and prejudices that disabled people face on a daily basis.

Key areas of interest include:

- The analysis of representations of disability in all forms of cultural production (e.g., literature, film, art, advertising, television, etc.), and how these shape wider public understandings of disability.
- Curricular reform at all levels of education.

The CCDS events bring together a mix of Early Career Researchers and professors in the field. The seminars are often filmed. People can subscribe to this channel to access various videos.

== Creative writing ==
In the early 21st century, Bolt was involved in creative writing as a tutor at Newcastle Under Lyme College and as a writer of poetry and short stories. His short stories appeared in Breath & Shadow, the literary magazine of the organization Ability Maine. Short stories include, "Spangles", "The Currency of Beauty", and "The Silent Treatment". "The Silent Treatment" was anthologized in the book Dozen: The Best of Breath and Shadow (2016, CreateSpace; ISBN 9781541266407).
