= Bolt family =

Family

Bolt
- Noble family
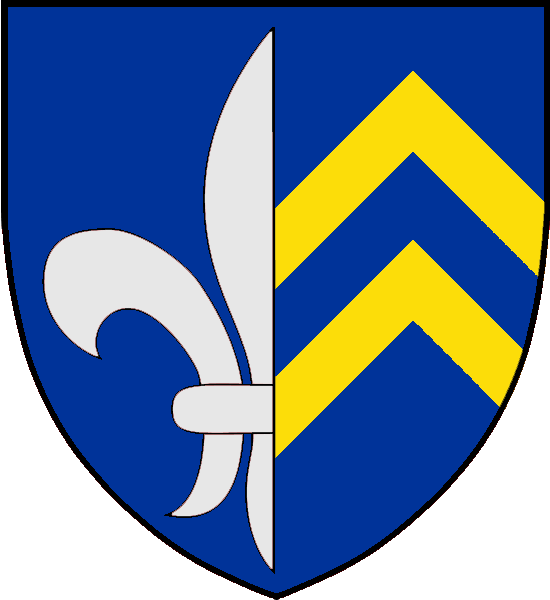
- Country: Norway
- Founded: 1333; 693 years ago
- Founder: Kolbein Berdorsen of Flesberg
- Titles: Aslak Bolt, Archbishop
- Members: Aslak Bolt; Amund Sigurdsson
- Connected families: Norwegian royal family Bolt family
- Estates: Tronstad, Hurum; Flesberg, Råde

The Bolt family was an aristocratic family in Norway originating Østfold. Founded in the 14th century, it has spawned aristocratic titles including the Archbishop of Nidaros. The family's first known member is Kolbein Berdorsen at Flesberg in Våler, Østfold (mentioned 1333). From him descend two lineages through the sons Berdor (mentioned 1357–1370) and Aslak (mentioned as councilor in Oslo during the 1350s).

== History ==
=== Descent and claims ===
The House was founded in the 14th century by Kolbein Berdorsen at Flesberg (known 1333), from whom all members descend. The most prominent member of the family was Aslak Harniktsson Bolt (born about 1375, died 1450) who in 1407 became bishop of Oslo, 1408 in Bergen and 1428 archbishop.

Aslak Bolt was the first Norwegian archbishop to hold the title of "the legacy of the papal throne". However, Bolt is best known as a politician and in 1436 he attended the meeting in Kalmar, Sweden, where a proposal for a new union act was prepared. During the leave of absence after King Kristofer's death, he was the leader of the group of great men and church people who wanted an association with Sweden under Karl Knutsson.

One of the family's most famous members was Amund Sigurdsson Bolt, who made himself known as a rebel leader against king Erik of Pomerania 1436–1437 and led the common people in the Oslo Fjord area in this uprising that was based on part of Erik of Pomerania's policy. The uprising was probably inspired by Engelbrekt Engelbrektsson's uprising in Sweden 1434–1436, where farmers in the province of Dalarna were mobilized to fight against Erik of the Pomeranian regime. In a letter from Danzig dated March 10, 1436, Engelbrekt tells of an uprising against Erik which was also in full swing in Norway. A settlement between the Norwegian rebels and the Riksdag was signed in Jersø near Tønsberg in June 1436. A ceasefire would apply until October when Riksrådet (English: Council of the State) and five lay people would meet in Oslo to hear the general complaints. This meeting did not take place, but Akershus courtier, Svarte Jøns Nilsson, distanced himself from the uprising. According to some sources, he has been subjected to a violent death. However, the source material is relatively thin. In recent research, it is therefore dispensed with that statements then do not know much about Amund Sigurdsson's further fate. In any case, he was dead before 1463.

Gertrud Amundsdotter was married to Peder Ulfsson (died 1437–1442) and one of their sons was named after his grandfather Amund Bolt and initially carried Bolt's coat of arms, which he later exchanged for his father's coat of arms a rose. He had a son Amund (Anund) Bolt (died about 1485).

=== Estates ===
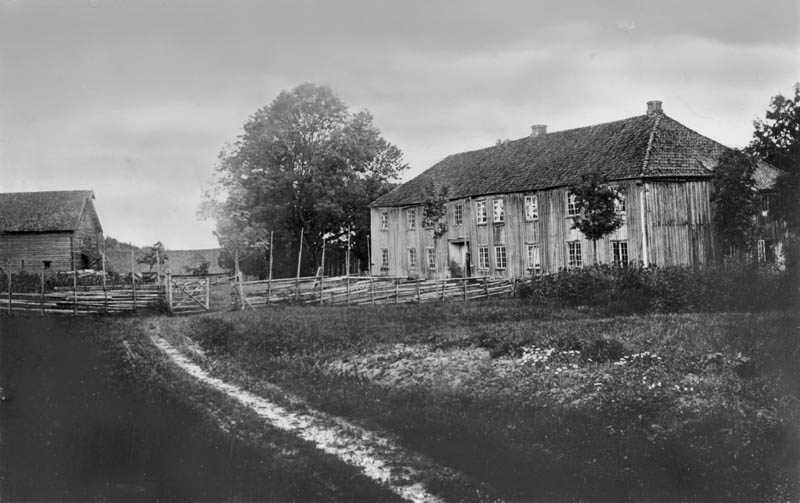
Tronstad estate 1899

Agmund Berdorsson Bolt may have acquired Tronstad from Kolbjørn Torgilsson, or his heirs, through a purchase or pledge. Thereafter, the estate has been inherited by the descendants for a hundred years. Olav Eriksson til Tronstad and his widowed mother Gudrun Håkonsdotter Bolt may have been in financial trouble in 1490 and therefore did not object to Anders van Bergen and Bishop Herlog Vigleiksson in 1491 requesting to take over most of the property from them and their heirs through redemption.

Gudrun Olavsdatter til Tronstad was the daughter of Olav and married Anders Ulvsson Lindorm (1480–1544) from Tjuvkil, belonging to Bohus län's low savior. For a long time afterwards, she and her heirs disputed with Østråtätten about Boltätten's inheritance right to the estate in Trondstad, through lawsuits. [7]

In 1544, Olav and Tore's granddaughters, Margrete and Anne Andersdöttrar, and their husbands, Ulv Gjermundsson at Tjuvkil and Sveinung Torbjørnsson at Instön, sold the Odelsrett (an ancient Scandinavian allodial title) to the estate left by Olav Eriksson, and his mother, Gudrun. The buyers were honest and well-behaved Peder Hanssøn (Litle / Basse) and his wife Ingeborg Nilsdotter.

Despite this, the Bolt family's descendants Lindorm traveled from Tjuvkil until 1580, when Margareta Andersdatter Lindorm's children Ulv Ulvsson, Karen Ulfsdatter and Gro Ulfsdatter (married to Nils Pedersson), and Anna Andersdatter's children Olof Svenningsson and Arne Svenningsson sued Peder Hansson (Litle) at Akershus and his wife that Ingeborg Nilsdatter would be considered to have the right to inherit the estate Tronstad sold in 1544. The outcome of the case was that the court confirmed the previous relationship between the parties. Thus, Lindormsätten lost its claim to Trondstad forever.

== Members of the family ==
- Haakon Agmundsen Bolt, to Mosseros og Tronstad. Born abt. 1385, dead 1438.
- Alv Haraldsson Bolt was a member of the Council of the State 1300s.
- Agmund Berdorsson Bolt was a member of the Council of the State 1400s. He acquired Mosseros.
- Aslak Bolt was Archbishop in Nidaros 1428–1450.
- Agmund Sigurdsson Bolt leader of an insurrection in the 1430s.

== Coat of arms ==
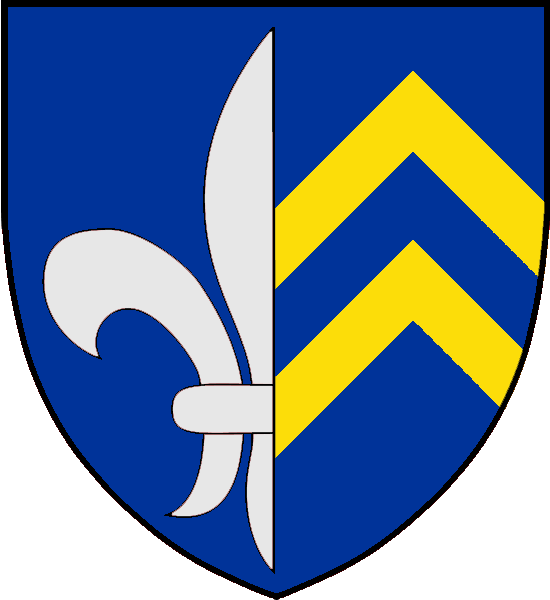
Arms of the Boalt family, and later the province of for the municipality of Våler, Østfold (kommune), Norway.

Arms of the Bolt family

== Bibliography ==
- C. M. Munthe: «Norske slegtsmerker», ’’Norsk slektshistorisk tidsskrift’’, bind I, Oslo 1928, p 32 ff, p 155 ff and p 179–186.
