= Jens Olavssøn Bratt =

Norwegian clergyman (c. 1505–1548)

Jens Olavssøn Bratt (c. 1505 – 12 June 1548) was a Norwegian clergyman.

Bratt was born in the village of Andenes on the island of Andøya in Nordland, Norway. He was born into one of the families that constituted the remains of old Norwegian aristocracy and was a younger brother of Torbjørn Olavssøn Bratt. He and his brother were both enrolled at the University of Cologne.

He worked as a Canon for Archbishop Olav Engelbrektsson in Trondheim. Engelbrektsson was the last Roman Catholic to be the archbishop before he fled to exile in 1537. After the archbishop had to flee, Bratt adapted to the situation and continued to cooperate with the new Lutheran authorities. He worked with his brother, Torbjørn Bratt, who served as Bishop of the Diocese of Nidaros from 1546 until his death in 1548.
