= Roman Catholic Archdiocese of Nidaros =

Lost archdiocese of the Roman Catholic Church

Former Archdiocese of Nidaros Archidioecesis Nidrosiensis Nidaros Erkebispedømme
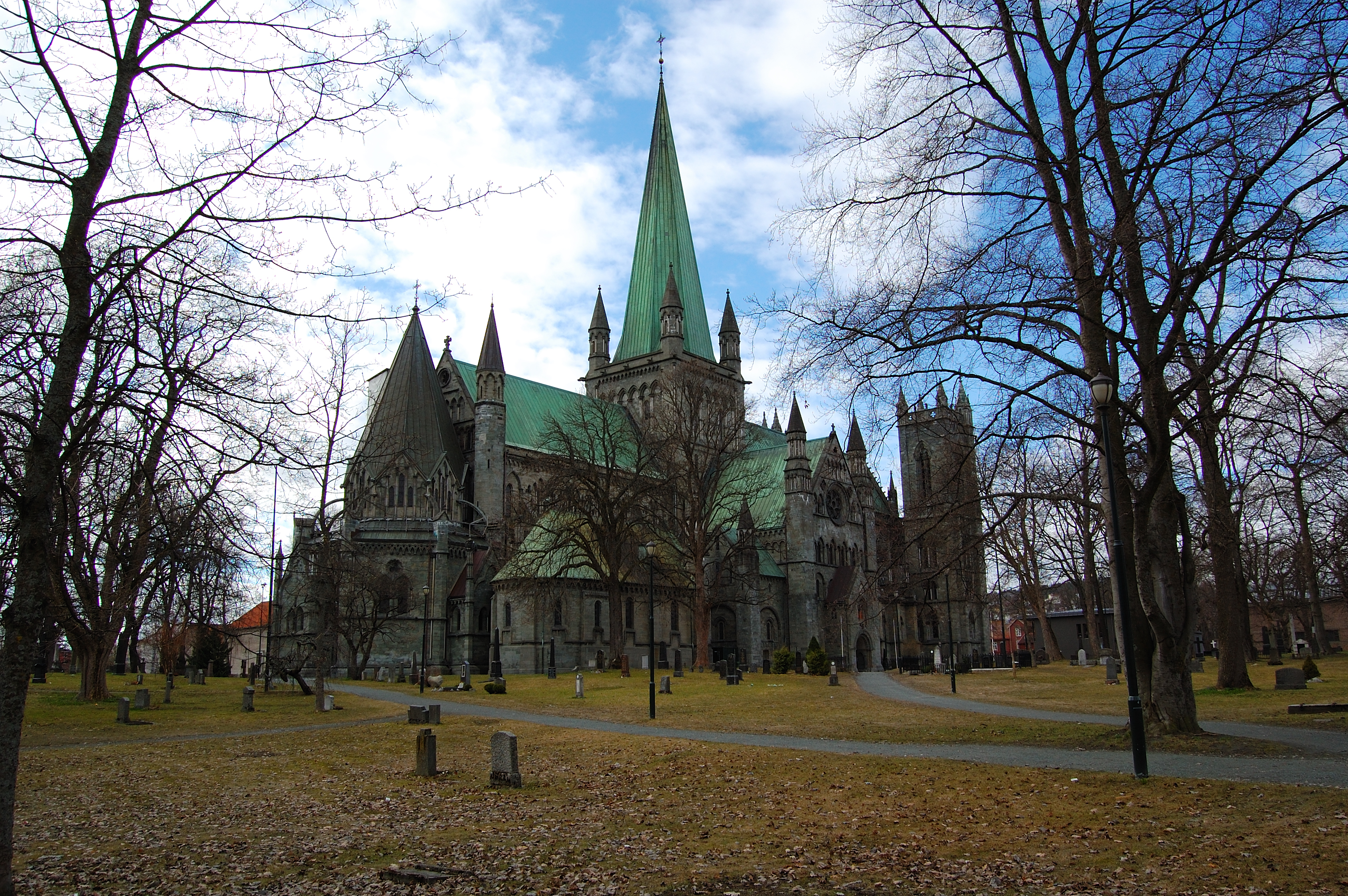
- Nidaros Cathedral, Trondheim, Norway

Location
- Country: Norway
- Ecclesiastical province: Nidaros
- Metropolitan: Nidaros, Trondheim, Sør-Trøndelag
- Coordinates: 63°25′37″N 10°23′49″E

Information
- Denomination: Catholic
- Rite: Latin Rite
- Established: 1152–1537 (Diocese 1030–1152, Evangelical Lutheran diocese since 1537)
- Cathedral: Nidaros Cathedral

The Archdiocese of Nidaros (or Niðaróss) was the metropolitan see covering Norway in the later Middle Ages. The see was the Nidaros Cathedral, in the city of Nidaros (now Trondheim). The archdiocese existed from the middle of the twelfth century until the Protestant Reformation.

== History ==
In Norway, the kings who introduced Christianity which first became known to the people during their martial expeditions. The work of Christianization begun by Haakon the Good (d. 961 in the Battle of Fitjar) was carried on by Olaf Tryggvason (d. 1000 in the Battle of Svolder) and Olaf Haraldsson (St. Olaf, d. 1030 in the Battle of Stiklestad). Both were converted Vikings, the former having been baptized at Andover, England, by Aelfeah, Bishop of Winchester, and the latter at Rouen by Archbishop Robert.

In 997, Olaf Tryggvason founded at the mouth of the river Nidelva the city of Nidaros (now Trondheim) where he built a Kongsgård estate and a church; he laboured to spread Christianity in Norway, the Orkney and Shetland Islands, the Faroe Islands, Iceland, and Greenland. King Olaf Haraldsson created an episcopal see at Nidaros, installing the monk Grimkill as bishop. Moreover, many English and German bishops and priests came to Norway. The Norwegian bishops were at first dependent on the Archbishop of Hamburg-Bremen, and afterwards on the Archbishop of Lund, Primate of Scandinavia. As the Norwegians wanted an archbishop of their own, Pope Eugene III, resolving to create a metropolitan see at Nidaros, sent thither as legate (1151) Cardinal Nicholas of Albano (Nicholas Breakspeare), afterwards Adrian IV. The legate installed Jon Birgerson, previously Bishop of Stavanger, as Archbishop of Nidaros. The bishops of Bergen (bishop about 1068), Faroe Diocese (1047), Garðar, Greenland (1126), Hamar (1151), Hólar, Iceland (1105), Orkney (1070; suffragan till 1472), Oslo (1073), Skálholt, Iceland (1056), and Stavanger (1130) became suffragans.

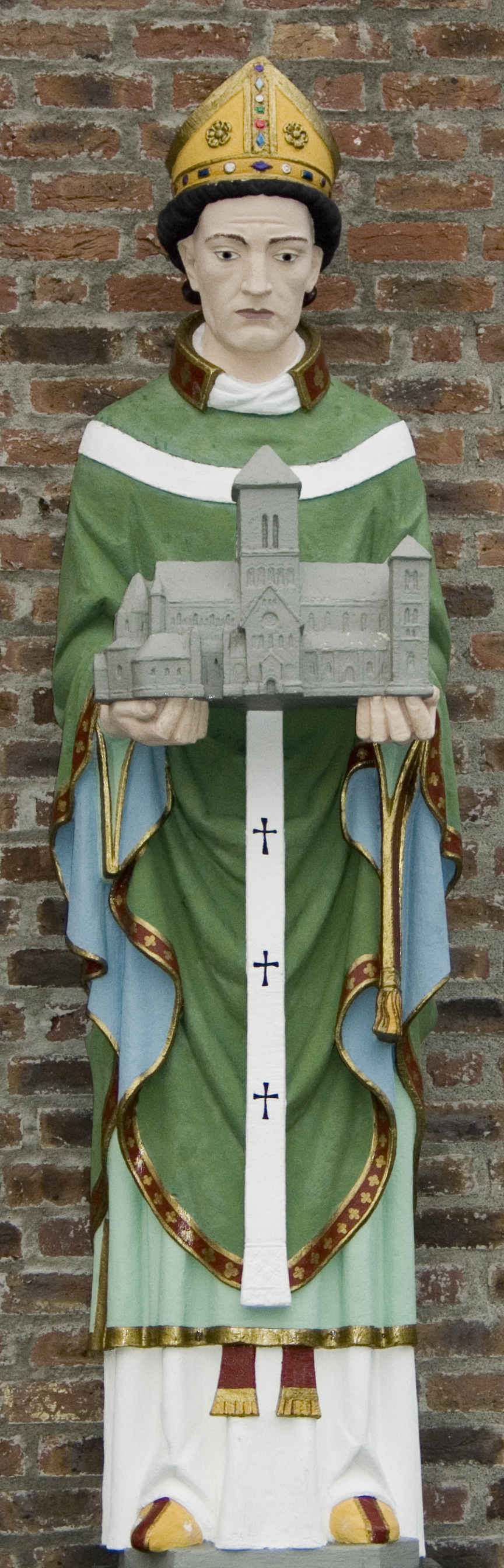
St.Eystein, the second Archbishop of Nidaros holding a model of the Nidaros Cathedral

Archbishop Birgerson was succeeded by Eysteinn Erlendsson (Beatus Augustinus, 1158–88), previously royal secretary and treasurer, a man of intellect, strong will, and piety. King Sverre wished to make the Church a tool of the temporal power, and the archbishop was compelled to flee from Norway to England. He was able to return, and a reconciliation took place later between him and the king, but on Eystein's death King Sverre renewed his attacks, and Archbishop Eric had to leave the country and take refuge with Absalon, Archbishop of Lund. At last, when King Sverre attacked the papal legate, Pope Innocent III laid the king and his partisans under interdict.

King Haakon III (1202), son and successor of King Sverre, hastened to make peace with the Church. Pope Innocent III gave Thorer, Archbishop of Drontheim, authority over all Scandinavian territory, including Greenland and Vinland, the Norse name for North America. To regulate ecclesiastical affairs, which had suffered during the struggles with Sverre, Pope Innocent IV in 1247 sent Cardinal William of Sabina as legate to Norway. He intervened against encroachments on the part of the bishops, reformed various abuses, and abolished the ordeal by hot iron. Owing in great measure to the papal legates, Norway became more closely linked with the supreme head of Christendom at Rome. Secular priests, Benedictines, Cistercians, Augustinians, Dominicans and Franciscans worked together for the prosperity of the Church. Archbishops Eilif Kortin (d. 1332), Paul Baardson (d. 1346), and Arne Vade (d. 1349) were zealous churchmen. Provincial councils were held, at which serious efforts were made to eliminate abuses and to encourage Christian education and morality.

In 1277, the Tønsberg Concord (Sættargjerden in Tønsberg) was signed between King Magnus VI of Norway and Jon Raude, the Archbishop of Nidaros confirming certain privileges of the clergy, the freedom of episcopal elections and similar matters. Nidaros (Trondheim), the metropolis of the ecclesiastical province, was also the capital of Norway. The residence of the kings until 1217, it remained until the Reformation the heart and centre of the spiritual life of the country. There was situated the tomb of St. Olaf, and around the patron of Norway, "Rex perpetuus Norvegiae", the national and ecclesiastical life of the country was centred. The feast of St. Olaf on 29 July was a day or reunion for "all the nations of the Northern seas, Norwegians, Swedes, Goths, Cimbrians, Danes and Slavs", to quote an old chronicler, in the cathedral of Nidaros, where the reliquary of St. Olaf rested near the altar. Built in Roman style by King Olaf Kyrre (d. 1093), the cathedral had been enlarged by Archbishop Eystein in Gothic style. It was finished only in 1248 by Archbishop Sigurd Sim. Although several times destroyed by fire, the ancient cathedral was restored each time until the Reformation in Norway. Then Archbishop Eric Walkendorf was exiled (1521), and his successor, Olaf Engelbertsen, who had been the instrument of the royal will in the introduction of Lutheranism, had also, as a partisan of Christian II, to fly from Christian III (1537). The reliquaries of St. Olaf and St. Augustine (Eystein) were taken away, sent to Copenhagen and melted. The bones of St. Olaf were buried in the cathedral, and the place forgotten.

== Ecclesiastical province of Nidaros ==
Map of ecclesiastical province of Nidaros (1153-1387)

The Archdiocese of Nidaros headed an ecclesiastical province which included the following suffragan dioceses.

Diocese	Territory	Cathedral	Founded
Bjørgvin (earlier Selje)		Christ Church	1068
Oslo		St. Hallvards Cathedral	1068
Hamar		Hamar Cathedral	1152
Stavanger		Stavanger Cathedral	1125
Kirkjubøur	Faroe Islands	St. Magnus Cathedral	c. 1100
Kirkjuvagr	Orkney and Shetland	St. Magnus Cathedral	c. 1035
Suðreyjar	Isle of Man, Islands of the Clyde and the Hebrides	Peel Cathedral	1154
Skálholt	Southern Iceland	Skálholt Cathedral	1056
Hólar	Northern Iceland	Hólar Cathedral	1106
Garðar	Greenland	Gardar Cathedral	1124

== Episcopal ordinaries ==
Archbishop's Palace, Trondheim.

(all Latin Rite)

Suffragan Bishops of Nidaros

1. 1015: Sigurd III
2. Grimkjell
3. Jon
4. Rudolf
5. 1028–1030: Sigurd IV
6. Ragnar
7. Kjetil
8. Åsgaut
9. Sigurd V
10. Tjodolf
11. 1070: Sigurd VI, O.S.B.
12. 1080: Adalbrikt
13. –1139: Simon
14. 1140: Ivar Kalfsson (Skrauthanske)
15. 1140–1151: Reidar

Metropolitan Archbishops of Nidaros (before the Reformation)

1. 1152/1153–1157: Jon Birgersson
2. 1161–1188: Eysteinn Erlendsson
3. 1189–1205: Eirik Ivarsson
4. 1206–1214: Tore (Thorer) Gudmundsson
5. 1215–1224: Guttorm
6. 1225–1226: Peter Brynjulfsson
7. 1227–1230: Tore II "den Trøndske [the Trønder]"
8. 1231–1252: Sigurd Eindridesson Tafse
9. 1253–1254: Sørle
10. 1255–1263: Einar Smjørbak Gunnarsson
11. 1263–1265: Einar (rejected by Pope Clement IV in 1265)
12. 1267: Håkon
13. 1268–1282: Jon Raude
14. 1288–1309: Jørund
15. 1311–1332: Eilif Arnesson Kortin
16. 1333–1346: Paul Baardson (Páll Bárðarson / Pål Bårdsson)
17. 1346–1349: Arne Einarsson Vade
18. 1350–1370: Olav
19. 1371–1381: Trond Gardarsson
20. 1382–1386: Nicolas Jacobsson Rusare
21. 1387–1402: Vinald Henriksson
22. 1404–1428: Eskill
23. 1430–1450: Aslak Bolt
24. 1452–1458: Henrik Kalteisen, O.P.
25. 1459–1474: Olav Trondsson
26. 1475–1510: Gaute Ivarsson
27. 1510–1522: Eric Walkendorf (Erik Axelsson Valkendorf)
28. 1523–1537: Olav Engelbrektsson (the last Catholic archbishop)

== Rite of Nidaros ==
The texts of the Mass as it was celebrated in Norway and the other lands of the Metropolitan Province of Nidaros before the Protestant Reformation survives in a copy of the printed Missal of 1519 and in three manuscript texts, B (c. 1300), C (13th century) and D (c. 1200). Helge Fæhn in his analysis of each of these texts sums up the character of these texts as follows:

The Missal of 1519: Manuscript A seems to have been influenced mainly from Normandy and England and shows several parallels to late medieval Sarum Use. There is nothing which decisively indicates Dominican influence. Belonging to the 16th century A may be characterized as rather conservative. In the canon in Communicantes, Xystus is replaced by Silvester—possibly by a misinterpretation of Innocens III.

Manuscript B: B is especially influenced from France—in parts particularly from the leading Seez group. Some tails in B—mostly in the rubrics—are obviously dependent on the explanation of the mass in Micrologus, but most remarkable in perhaps that B seems to imply that the congregation is taking an active part in the offertory. B taken as a whole belongs to the second part of the 12th century.

Manuscript C: C is without doubt dependent on French and Italian tradition. The canon is evidently influenced by the specific Roman missal of the 11th—13th century, and on the whole C may be ascribed to the beginning of the 13th century.

Manuscript D: In D everything before the canon is lacking, but in return this part exhibits close relationship to Irish and especially old Roman tradition: the last is undoubtedly because D evidently is influenced by the order of the mass in Micrologus. D is the oldest of the four ordines misse and must be assigned to the 12th century.

Of these four orders of the mass, A and B seem to have most in common. If this can be taken as a further indication that B gives the substance of the rite of Nidaros in the 13th century, then this provides basis from which to determine the most important alterations in the rite of this see in the last 250 years before the Reformation.

== See also ==
- List of Catholic dioceses in Norway
- Pilgrim's Route

== Sources and external links ==
Other Bibliography

- Munch, P.A. Throndhjems Domkirke (Christiania, 1859)
- Krefting, O. Om Throndhjems Domkirke (Trondhjem, 1885)
- Schirmer, Kristkirken; Nidaros (Christiania, 1885)
- Mathiesen, Henry Det gamle Throndhjem (Christiani, 1897)
