= Aslak Bolt =

Norwegian priest

Title page of P. A. Munch's 1852 edition of Aslak Bolts Jordebok

Aslak Harniktsson Bolt (c. 1380 – 1450) was a 15th-century Norwegian priest who served as Archbishop of the Nidaros.

His parents were Harnikt Henningsson and Sigrid Aslaksdatter Bolt. His mother was a member of a Norwegian noble family.

He served as archbishop of Nidaros from about 1427 to 1450. He is most known for his detailed register of properties and incomes of the archdiocese, commonly known as Aslak Bolt's cadastre (Aslak Bolts jordebok) from 1432 to 1433. The properties listed included thousands of farms, and the survey has been an important and primary historical source from the period.
