= 1537 =

1537 in various calendars
- Gregorian calendar: 1537; MDXXXVII
- Ab urbe condita: 2290
- Armenian calendar: 986; ԹՎ ՋՁԶ
- Assyrian calendar: 6287
- Balinese saka calendar: 1458–1459
- Bengali calendar: 943–944
- Berber calendar: 2487
- English Regnal year: 28 Hen. 8 – 29 Hen. 8
- Buddhist calendar: 2081
- Burmese calendar: 899
- Byzantine calendar: 7045–7046
- Chinese calendar: 丙申年 (Fire Monkey); 4234 or 4027 — to — 丁酉年 (Fire Rooster); 4235 or 4028
- Coptic calendar: 1253–1254
- Discordian calendar: 2703
- Ethiopian calendar: 1529–1530
- Hebrew calendar: 5297–5298
- Hindu calendars
- Vikram Samvat: 1593–1594
- Shaka Samvat: 1458–1459
- Kali Yuga: 4637–4638
- Holocene calendar: 11537
- Igbo calendar: 537–538
- Iranian calendar: 915–916
- Islamic calendar: 943–944
- Japanese calendar: Tenbun 6 (天文６年)
- Javanese calendar: 1455–1456
- Julian calendar: 1537; MDXXXVII
- Korean calendar: 3870
- Minguo calendar: 375 before ROC 民前375年
- Nanakshahi calendar: 69
- Thai solar calendar: 2079–2080
- Tibetan calendar: མེ་ཕོ་སྤྲེ་ལོ་ (male Fire-Monkey); 1663 or 1282 or 510 — to — མེ་མོ་བྱ་ལོ་ (female Fire-Bird); 1664 or 1283 or 511

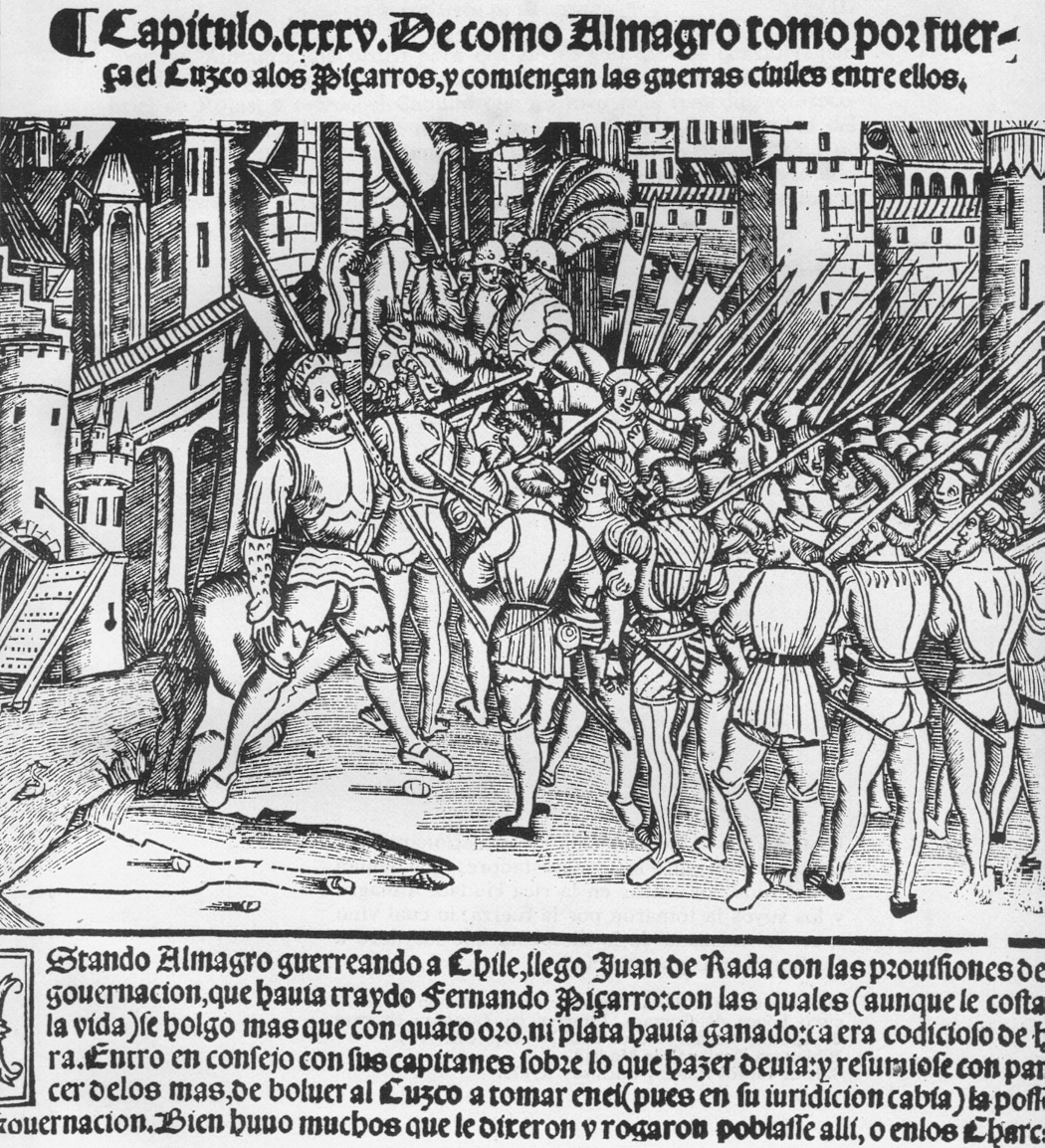
April 18: Diego de Almagro breaks the siege of Cuzco in Peru

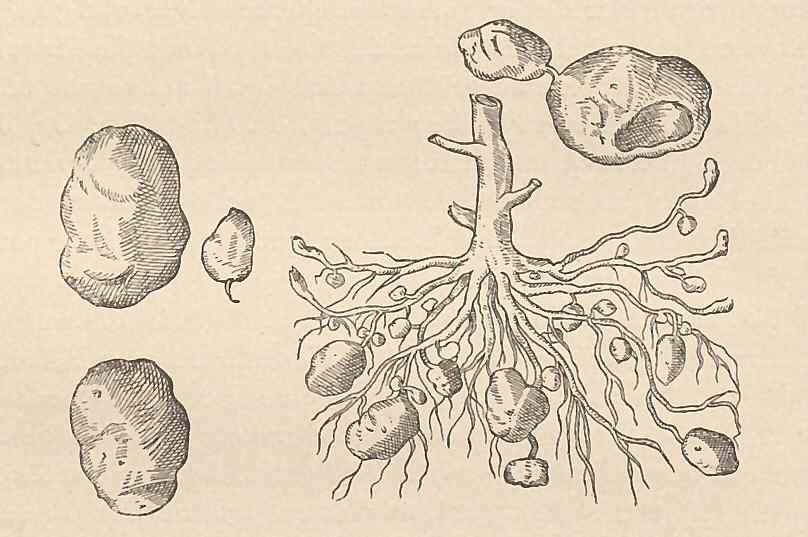
Potatoes are observed by Europeans for the first time during two Spanish expeditions in the Viceroyalty of Peru (pictured is a 1603 illustration of by Carolus Clusius's of "Papas Peruanorum").

Year 1537 (MDXXXVII) was a common year starting on Monday of the Julian calendar.

== Events ==
=== January–March ===
- January 1 – Princess Madeleine of Valois, the 16-year-old daughter of François I, King of France, is married to King James V of Scotland in a ceremony at the cathedral of Notre-Dame de Paris. Already in ill health at the time of the marriage, Madaleine lives only six more months before dying at the Holyrood Palace in Edinburgh on July 7.
- January 6 – Alessandro de' Medici, Duke of Florence is assassinated by Lorenzino de' Medici, a distant cousin, who claims that he wants to reintroduce republican rule but has to flee to Venice. Instead Cosimo I of the junior branch of the Medici becomes the new duke.
- January 16 – Bigod's Rebellion, an uprising by Roman Catholics, led by Francis Bigod against Henry VIII of England and Protestant Rebellion, begins with an unsuccessful attempt to seize Scarborough Castle in Yorkshire.
- January 19 – Most of Bigod's forces are captured by the English Army at a dawn raid of their camp at Beverley, Yorkshire, but Bigod escapes to Mulgrave and then to what is then the County of Cumberland.
- January – At the battle of Ollantaytambo, the Inca Emperor Manco Inca Yupanqui defeats the Spanish led by Hernando Pizarro and the Spaniards' Indian allies
- February 10 – Francis Bigod, leader of Bigod's rebellion is captured at Cumberland by the English Army and imprisoned at Carlisle Castle. He is hanged at Tyburn on June 2.
- March 8 – Chipatá, now in the Santander Department of the Republic of Colombia, is founded by the Spanish conquistadors Gonzalo Jiménez de Quesada and his brother Hernán Pérez de Quesada as the first settlement in what will become the Spanish colony of Nueva Granada, which will later be divided into the nations of Colombia and Venezuela.
- March 12 – Recife is founded by the Portuguese, in Brazil.

=== April–June ===
- April 1 – The Archbishop of Norway, Olav Engelbrektsson, flees from Trondheim to Lier, Belgium.
- April 18 – Diego de Almagro successfully charges Manco Inca's siege of Cuzco, thereby saving his antagonists, the Pizarro brothers.
- April 20 – Spanish conquest of the Muisca: Bacatá, the main settlement of the Muisca Confederation, is conquered by Gonzalo Jiménez de Quesada, effectively ending the Confederation in the Colombian Eastern Andes.
- May 17 –
  - The siege by Norwegian and Danish Protestants of Steinvikholm Castle in Norway, the former residence of the last Roman Catholic Archbishop of Norway, ended after a month when the Catholic defenders surrendered to the Danish commander, Tord Roed.
  - The Ottoman Empire invaded southern Italy, attacking the cities of Apulia, Otranto and Brindisi, in a campaign that would last until November 22.
- June 2 – Pope Paul III publishes the encyclical Sublimis Deus, which declares the natives of the New World to be rational beings with souls, who must not be enslaved or robbed.
- June 23 – The Siege of Hamar ends with the arrest of Bishop Mogens Lauritssøn, and the Catholic rebellion is definitively ended in Norway.

=== July–September ===
- July 12– Rodrigo Orgóñez occupies and sacks the Inca center of Vitcos at the battle of Abancay, but Manco Inca Yupanqui escapes and establishes the independent Neo-Inca State elsewhere in Vilcabamba, Peru.
- July 22 – Upon the death of his father, Bhim Singh, Ratan Singh becomes the new ruler of the Kingdom of Amber with a capital at Amber in what is now the Rajasthan state in India
- July 23 – The third Ottoman–Venetian War begins as the Ottoman Sultan Suleiman the Magnificent leads an invasion of the Republic of Venice. The war will continue until October 2, 1540.
- August 2 – The battle of Montemurlo, an attempt by residents of the former Republic of Florence to overthrow Cosimo I de' Medici, Duke of Florence and restore the republican government, ends in failure. The Medici family then takes revenge on the supporters of the Republic, including the Republic commander, General Piero Strozzi.
- August 12 – The coronation of Christian III as King of Denmark and King of Norway takes place at Copenhagen.
- August 15 – The city of Asunción, now the capital of the South American nation of Paraguay, is founded by Juan de Salazar de Espinosa.
- August 25 – The Honourable Artillery Company, the oldest surviving regiment in the British Army, and the second most senior, is formed.
- August 26–The siege of the island of Corfu is started by the Ottoman Empire Navy, commanded by Suleiman the Magnificent. Suleiman abandons the siege in September after an outbreak of plague, and the Ottoman troops return home.
- September 2 – King Christian III of Denmark and Norway appoints Gjeble Pederssøn as Norway's first Lutheran bishop for the Church of Norway.
- September 12 – King Carlos I of Spain (who is also the Holy Roman Emperor) issues a royal decree providing for the first election in the New World, allowing he citizens of the Province of Rio de la Plata (now Paraguay) to elect a replacement for the late Captain-General Pedro de Mendoza. Domingo Martínez de Irala is elected the new Captain-General in 1538.

=== October–December ===
- October 15 – Following the baptism of her son, the future Edward VI of England, Jane Seymour begins suffering from puerperal fever. The Queen consort dies nine days later.

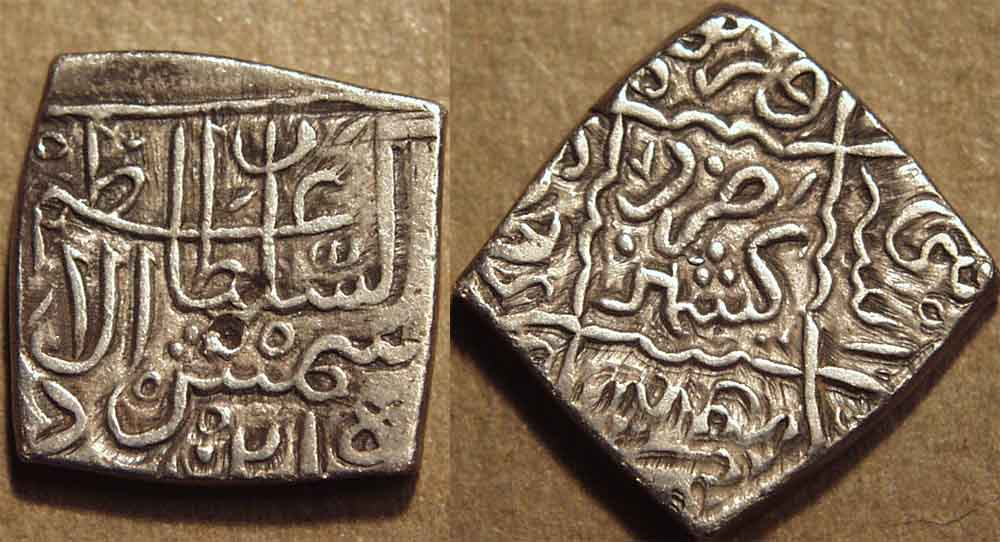
Silver coin (sasnu) of the Kashmiri sultan Shams al-Din Shah II, 1537-38

- November 1 – In what is now the Central American nation of Honduras, the Spanish conquistadore Alonso de Cáceres arrives at the Peñol de Cerquín, the mountaintop fortress of King Lempira of the Lencas, the indigenous leader of the resistance against European rule. Cáceres sends envoys to request Lempira to surrender. In response, Lempira has the Spanish messengers executed.
- November 27 – Alfonso d'Avalos, the Marquis of Vasto in Italy, enters into a three-month truce with the French Duke of Montmorency to negotiate a peace for which areas would be under French control.
- December 9 – Petar Keglević takes office as the new Ottoman Governor of Croatia and of Slavonia.
- December 28 – The Ordonnance de Montpellier, establishing the first system in Europe for all writers to submit copies of their printed work to the government for review and maintenance in a library, is signed into law by King François I of France. The law provides that a book cannot be legally sold until a copy has been deposited in the royal library.

=== Date unknown ===
- Spanish counquistadors in what are now Peru and Colombia become the first Europeans to discover the potato, one of the staple foods for the indigenous residents, while exploring the houses of who have fled from their homes. Pedro Cieza de León, part of the expedition to Colombia, mentions the potato in a book that he publishes 16 years later while Don Juan Castellanos refers to the edible plant as part of a military report on raiding an Inca village in Peru. The potato is introduced to Europe more than 30 years later, in 1570.
- Kashmiri sultan Muhammad Shah dies and he is succeeded by Shams al-Din Shah II as sultan of Kashmiri Shah Mir Sultanate in 1537.
- Kiritimati (Acea or "Christmas Island") is probably sighted by the Spanish mutineers from Hernando de Grijalva's expedition.
- The Indian city of Bangalore is first mentioned in print. .
- The dissolution of the monasteries takes place in Norway, as religious organizations are dissolved by King Christian III; these include Bakke Abbey, Munkeby Abbey, Tautra Abbey, Nidarholm Abbey, Gimsøy Abbey and Utstein Abbey.
- Publication is made of two complete Bible translations into English, both based on Tyndale's. Myles Coverdale's 1535 text is the first to be printed in England (by James Nicholson in Southwark, London) The Matthew Bible, edited by John Rogers under the pseudonym "Thomas Matthew" and printed in Antwerp.

=== Ongoing ===
- Dissolution of the monasteries in England: Religious organizations dissolved by Henry VIII of England include: Bisham Priory, Castle Acre Priory, Chertsey Abbey, Furness Abbey, London Charterhouse and Valle Crucis Abbey.

== Births ==
Willem IV van den Bergh

- January 16 – Albrecht VII, Count of Schwarzburg-Rudolstadt (d. 1605)
- January 21 – Antonio Maria Salviati, Italian Catholic cardinal (d. 1602)
- February 26 – Christopher II, Margrave of Baden-Rodemachern (d. 1575)
- March 4 or January 23 – Longqing Emperor, Emperor of China (d. 1572)
- May 18 – Guido Luca Ferrero, Italian Catholic cardinal (d. 1585)
- May 20 – Hieronymus Fabricius, Italian anatomist (d. 1619)
- May 27 – Louis IV, Landgrave of Hesse-Marburg, son of Landgrave Philip I (d. 1604)
- May 31 – Shah Ismail II of Persia (d. 1577)
- June 3 – João Manuel, Prince of Portugal, Portuguese prince (d. 1554)
- July 20 – Arnaud d'Ossat, French diplomat and writer (d. 1604)
- July 29 – Pedro Téllez-Girón, 1st Duke of Osuna, Spanish duke (d. 1590)
- July 30 – Christopher, Duke of Mecklenburg and administrator of Ratzeburg (d. 1592)
- August 9 – Francesco Barozzi, Italian mathematician (d. 1604)
- August 15 – Shimazu Toshihisa, Japanese samurai (d. 1592)
- October – Lady Jane Grey, claimant to the throne of England (d. 1554)
- October 12 – King Edward VI of England (d. 1553)
- November 21 – Fadrique Álvarez de Toledo, 4th Duke of Alba, Spanish military leader (d. 1583)
- December 5 – Ashikaga Yoshiaki, Japanese shōgun (d. 1597)
- December 20 – King John III of Sweden (d. 1592)
- December 24 – Willem IV van den Bergh, Stadtholder of Guelders and Zutphen (d. 1586)
- December 26 – Albert, Count of Nassau-Weilburg (d. 1593)
- date unknown
  - Jane Lumley, English translator (d. 1578)
  - Shimizu Muneharu, Japanese military commander (d. 1582)
  - John Almond, English Cistercian monk (d. 1585)
  - Jan Krzysztof Tarnowski, Polish noble (d. 1567)
  - Toyotomi Hideyoshi, Japanese warlord (d. 1598)

== Deaths ==
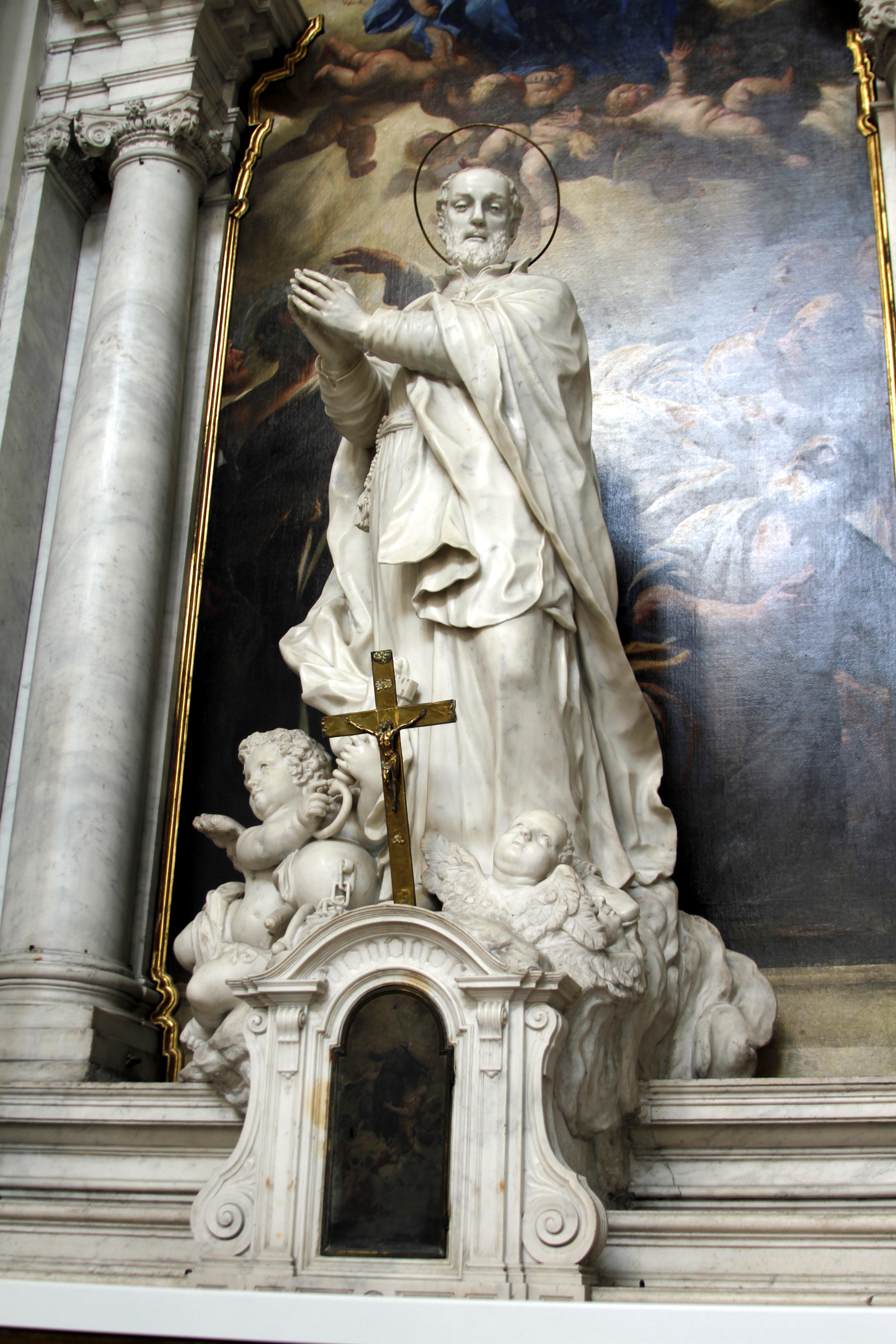
Saint Gerolamo Emiliani

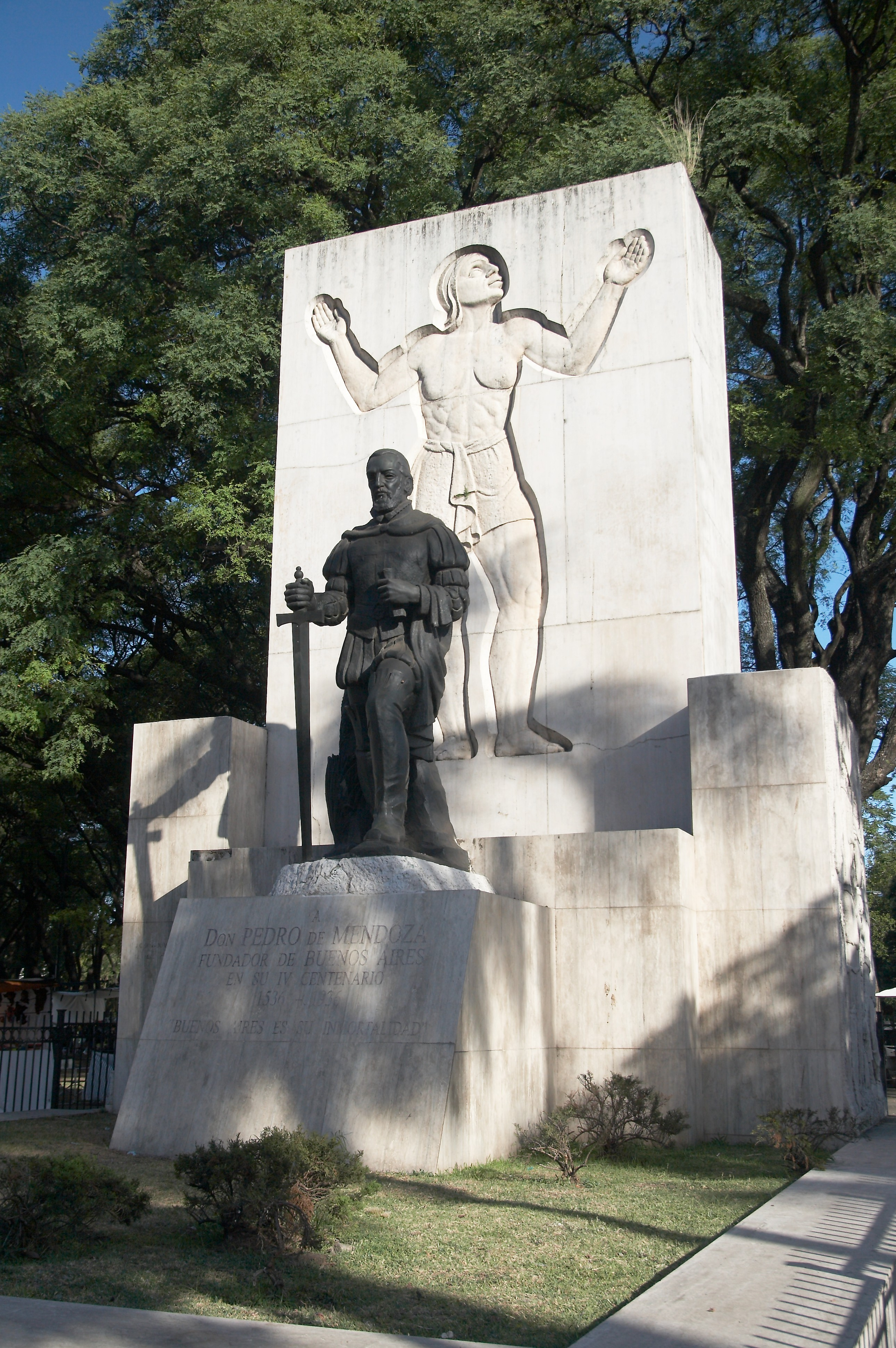
Pedro de Mendoza

- January 6
  - Alessandro de' Medici, Duke of Florence (b. 1510)
  - Baldassare Peruzzi, Italian architect and painter (b. 1481)
- January 12 – Lorenzo di Credi, Florentine painter and sculptor (b. 1459)
- February 2 – Johann Carion, German astrologer and chronicler (b. 1499)
- February 3 – Thomas FitzGerald, 10th Earl of Kildare, Anglo-Irish noble, rebel (executed) (b. 1513)
- February 8
  - Otto von Pack, German conspirator (b. c. 1480)
  - Saint Gerolamo Emiliani, Italian humanitarian (b. 1481)
- January 11 – John, Hereditary Prince of Saxony, German prince (b. 1498)
- March 25 – Charles, Duke of Vendôme, French noble (b. 1489)
- March 28 – Francesco of Saluzzo, Marquess of Saluzzo (b. 1498)
- May 10 – Andrzej Krzycki, Polish archbishop (b. 1482)
- May 24 – Sophie of Brandenburg-Ansbach-Kulmbach, German princess (b. 1485)
- June 2
  - Francis Bigod, English noble, rebel (b. 1507)
  - Thomas Percy, English rebel (b 1504)
  - Adam Sedbar, English abbot and rebel (b. 1502)
- June 23 – Pedro de Mendoza, Spanish conquistador (b. 1487)
- June 29 – Henry Percy, 6th Earl of Northumberland, English noble (b. 1502)
- July 7 – Madeleine of Valois, queen of James V of Scotland (b. 1520)
- July 12 – Robert Aske, English lawyer, rebel (executed) (b. 1500)
- September 4 – Johann Dietenberger, German theologian (b. c. 1475)
- September 7 – Nikolaus von Schönberg, German Catholic cardinal (b. 1472)
- September 20 – Pavle Bakić, last Serb Despot and medieval Serb monarch
- September 25 – William Framyngham, English author
- October 24 – Jane Seymour, 3rd queen consort of Henry VIII of England (complications of childbirth) (b. c. 1508)
- October 29 – Elizabeth Lucar, English calligrapher (b. 1510)
- December 10 or December 11 – Andrey of Staritsa, son of Ivan III of Russia the Great (b. 1490)
- date unknown – John Kite, Archbishop of Armagh and Bishop of Carlisle
- probable – Thomas Murner, German satirist (b. 1475)
