= Görvel Fadersdotter (Sparre) =

Swedish noblewoman and county administrator (1509 or 1517–1605)

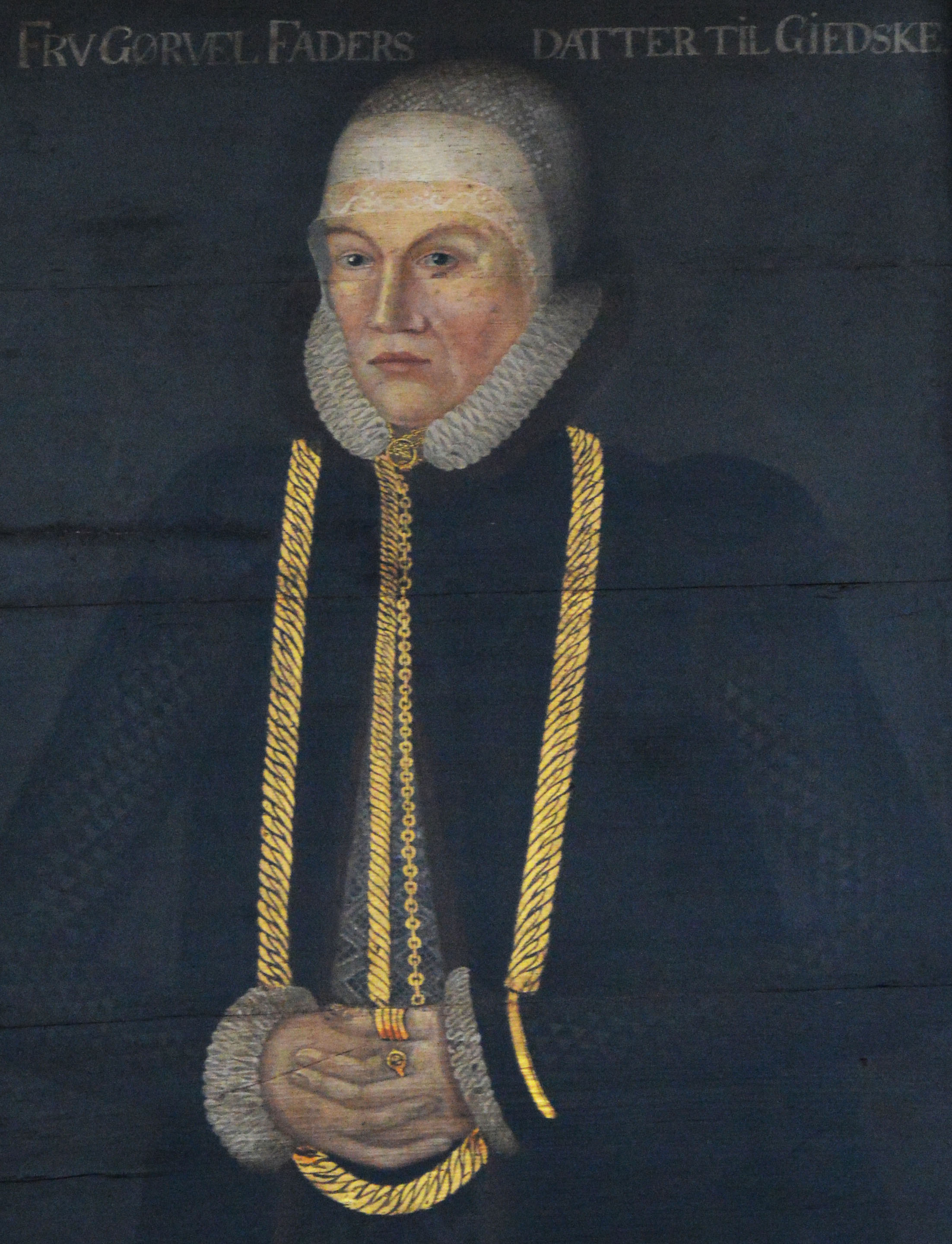
Görvel Fadersdotter (Sparre)

Görvel Fadersdotter (Sparre) (1509 or 1517 – 20 April 1605) was a Swedish noblewoman and county administrator. She was a major landowner in Denmark, Norway, and Sweden.

== Early life ==
Görvel Fadersdotter was born on 1509 or 1517, at Hjulsta Manor in Uppland, Sweden. She was the daughter of Fader Nilsson (Sparre of Hjulsta and Ängsö) (died c. 1523) and Bodil Knutsdotter (Tre Rosor) of Mörby (died by 1520). She was an early orphan and a great heiress through both her parents. Her maternal grandfather Knut Alvsson was the greatest landholder in Norway. When he rebelled against King Hans and sided with the Swedes in 1501, his estates were confiscated by the crown after he was slain. This property, consisting of 200 estates in Norway and Denmark, was later given to Görvel Fadersdotter.

Görvel Fadersdotter was married and widowed three times; in 1532 to Swedish riksråd Peder Nilsson Grip (1507–1533); in 1534 to Danish riksråd Truid Gregersen Ulfstand (1487–1545); and in 1547 to Danish riksråd Lave Brahe (1500–1567). She had one child; her son Nils Ulfstand, (1535–1548), who died of the plague during a trip with his stepfather. During her second marriage, she left Sweden for Varberg Fortress in then Danish (now Swedish) Halland, where her spouse was county administrator. During the Count's Feud (Grevefeiden) Görvel Fadersdotter was held as prisoner there and confronted with various legal claims of her lands from her Norwegian and Swedish relatives and stepchildren. In the 1530s, she had the Danish-Norwegian monarch appointed her guardian to further protect her interests. At the death of her son in 1548, she was in sole control of large territories.

== Landowner ==
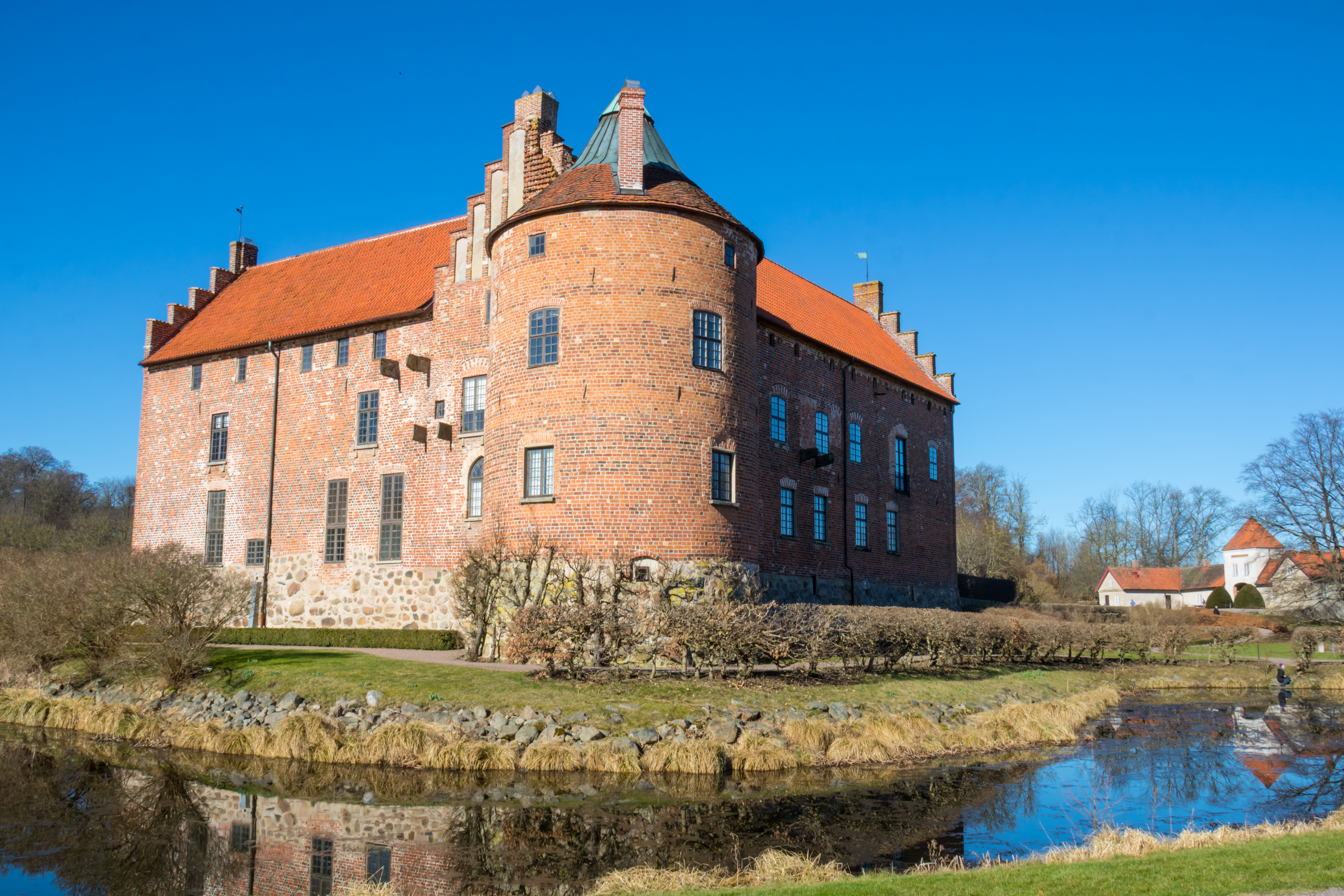
Torup Castle in Skåne

Görvel Fadersdotter was described as clever, sensible and was reportedly successful in her ambitions. In 1574, she renounced her claims on the debts owed to her by the crown, and was in exchange granted the fief Troll's Manor (Trolleberg) as county administrator. She later exchanged her Norwegian properties with King Frederick II of Denmark for equivalent compensation in Skåne. Between 1582 and 1599, she granted the Danish crown her Norwegian holdings in Nordenfjeldske; Giske (Giskegodset), Finne (Finnegodset) and Bjarkøya (Bjarkøygodset) . In 1582, she received the fief Börringekloster in Skåne and some minor parishes. In 1601, she made King Christian IV of Denmark the heir to her Danish and Swedish lands. Her Swedish holdings had been confiscated during the Northern Seven Years' War (1563–1570), but were given back at the time of the Danish-Swedish treaty at Flakkebäck in 1603.

Görvel Fadersdotter managed her estates with the help of good tenants, obtained huge profits from her lands, and constructed the Torup Castle (Torups slott) in Skåne after her own drawings. She only visited Norway once, but was from the 1530s a frequent guest of the Danish King, as he was of her. Among her estates, she preferred to live at Börringekloster, where she acted as the guardian of many daughters of the nobility. She died at her favourite estate on 20 April 1605.

== Other sources ==
- Sparre, Gjørvel (Gjørrild) Fadersdatter i Carl Frederik Bricka, Dansk biografisk Lexikon (första utgåvan, 1902)
- S.H. Finne-Grønn: Gørvel Fadersdatter (Sparre), Norsk biografisk leksikon V (Oslo 1931), ss. 144–146.
- Poul Colding: Sparre, Gørvel (Gjørvel, Gjørrild) Fadersdatter, Dansk biografisk leksikon (andra utgåvan), XXII (Köpenhamn 1942), ss. 337–339.
- Thure Månsson: (Sparre), Görvel Fadersdotter, Svenska Män och Kvinnor, 7 (Stockholm 1954), s. 134.
- Hans Gillingstam: Sparre av Hjulsta och Ängsö, Äldre svenska frälsesläkter. Ättartavlor, I:2 (Stockholm 1965), s. 191–198, särskilt s. 195, Görvel Fadersdotter.
- Thelma Jexlev (Poul Colding): Sparre, Gørvel (Gjørvel, Gyrvel) Fadersdatter, Dansk biografisk leksikon, tredje utgåvan, 13 (Köpenhamn 1983), ss. 585–586.
- Kjeldeskriftfondet ved Per-Øivind Sandberg: Gørvel Fadersdatters regnskap over Giske og Giskegodset 1563, Kjeldeskriftfondet (Oslo 1986), ss. 4–9.
