= Siege of Hamar =

Battle Between Norway And Denmark

- Part of Olav Engelbrektsson's rebellion and the Protestant Reformation
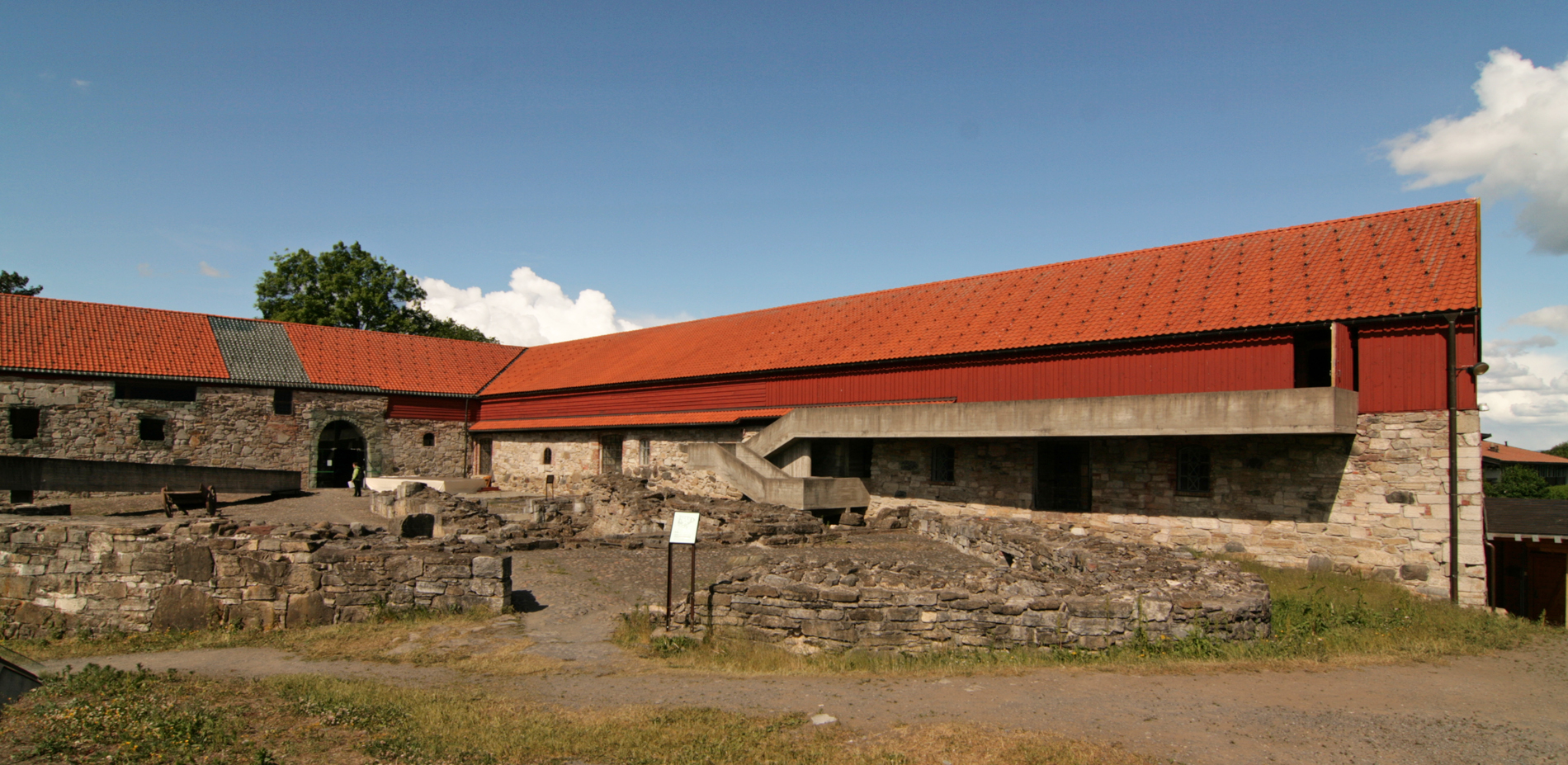
- The farm today
Date	20 June 1537 – 23 June 1537
Location	Hamar farm (Hamarhus) in Hamar 60°47′33″N 11°02′23″E
Result	Protestant victory: Bishop Mogens Lauritssøn surrendered and was captured; Collapse of Catholicism in Norway; Creation of Denmark-Norway

Belligerents
Norwegian Catholics	Denmark; Norwegian Protestants

Commanders and leaders
Mogens Lauritssøn (POW)	(Denmark) Truid Ulfstand

Strength
Unknown (maybe under 100)	Unknown (maybe over 1,000)

Casualties and losses
Unknown (probably few)	Unknown (probably few)

The siege of Hamar was a short siege that lasted for three days in late June 1537, between the forces of Catholic bishop Mogens Lauritssøn and noble Truid Ulfstand. Truid Ulfstand and his forces came down from Trondheim to arrest the bishop as a part of the Reformation in Denmark–Norway and Holstein. The bishop heard that he was going to be arrested and barricaded himself and his men inside his castle at Hamar before the Protestant troops came. The Protestant troops were superior both in numbers and military tech, (most of the Protestant troops where German Landsknecht, but the Catholic troops where mostly peasant militia) and when the Protestant troops arrived they laid siege to the castle. The commander of the Protestant forces had a parley with the bishop, and gave him three days to surrender or he would burn the castle. On the third day of the siege the bishop surrendered and was taken as a prisoner to Denmark, where he died in 1542.

According to the Hamar Chronicle, when the bishop left the city, he fell on his knees and thanked God for every day he had spent in the city. He asked the city to pray for him and said he would return. Then the chronicle states that he prayed: O Gud fader udi himmelen, findes vj icke för, da Gud giffue det vj findis i himmerige. Denne bön bad hand med grædende taare oc sagde, vale, vale, vale. (O God, Father in heaven, we do not exist for gifts from God, but to find heaven. He prayed this prayer while crying tears, and said farewell, farewell, farewell.)

The siege was one of the last stands against the Reformation in Norway, and the Norwegian riksråd was de facto abolished and Denmark-Norway became a real union that would last until 1814. Also the king of Denmark-Norway became the biggest landowner in Norway after confiscating church lands.

== See also ==
- Reformation in Norway
- Siege of Steinvikholm (1537)
