= Hamar Chronicle =

Love for nature

The Hamar Chronicle (Norwegian: Hamarkrøniken) is a book written in the 1500s by an unknown author. It describes life in the town of Hamar during the Catholic era (until 1537). The book is an important source for the study of Hamar's history because it describes the settlement of the town.

The book is first and foremost a local patriotic depiction of Hamar in the Middle Ages. It discusses the most important buildings (the cathedral, the bishop's residence, St. Olaf's Monastery, the cruciform church, Saint George's Church, the town hall, and the prison) as well as the life of the town and how it was governed, and it contains a short narrative about the last bishop's departure from the town. In addition, it lists all of the bishops in Hamar during the Catholic era.

== Origin ==
The author of the Hamar Chronicle is unknown, but from the language and the description there is reason to believe that the author was from Hedmarken, if not Hamar itself. On the other hand, the book tells about its origins: on July 22, 1553 many important people gathered at the Hamar farm (i.e., the bishop's residence) to review the bishop's letters and books. Following royal orders from Copenhagen, some of the Catholic archives were to be registered, and lensmann Christen Munk, the son-in-law of Truid Ulfstand, was to be responsible. He had gathered freeholders with allodial tenure and other secular men together, and together they were to record the most important of the town's buildings, streets, organization and population. Strikingly, it also presents many memories of the city's golden age and a narrative of earthquakes and the last bishop's struggle. It is widely believed that these observations were added by Trugels the cantor, the church choral director.

== Portents before the bishop's capture ==
The Hamar Chronicle describes portents before Bishop Mogens was captured. The chronicle says that in the middle of the night all the bells in the cathedral, the monastery, and the church began to ring of their own accord. In the church and the cathedral it was as though it were the middle of the day, and there was a sound as if two armies would fight. The chronicle goes on to say: Dernest om höy dags tijd beteede sig en gresselig stor orm oc forferdelig, som kaldis Siöormen, udi Miöß, som var gandske lang oc meget stor, oc siuntes at naa fra öens landt oc jnd udi Kongsland (Next there appeared in the middle of the day an enormously large and abominable sea serpent, called the Sjøorm, in Lake Mjøsa, which was exceedingly long and very large, and it seemed to be coming from the island [i.e., Helgøya, the 'holy island'] and approaching the land of the king.) It then relates how one of the bishop's men killed the beast with an arrow and how they disposed of its enormous carcass.

== Regarding the last bishop ==
Finally, the chronicle describes the occasion and the events of the day that Bishop Mogens was captured and sent to Denmark. The bishop had to surrender because of Truid Ulfstand's forces' modern weapons: bullets and gunpowder against the bishop's arrows and crossbows. When the bishop left the city, he fell on his knees and thanked God for every day he had spent in the city. He asked the city to pray for him and said he would return. Then the chronicle states that he prayed: O Gud fader udi himmelen, findes vj icke för, da Gud giffue det vj findis i himmerige. Denne bön bad hand med grædende taare oc sagde, vale, vale, vale. (O God, Father in heaven, we do not exist for gifts from God, but to find heaven. He prayed this prayer while crying tears, and said farewell, farewell, farewell.)

== Hamar's coat of arms ==
Hamar's coat of arms

The chronicle also describes what Hamar's coat of arms looked like, and it is from this depiction that today's municipal coat of arms was designed in 1899, on the occasion of the town's 50th anniversary. The chronicle states: Hammers vaaben det var en vhrhane med udslagen vinger vdi toppen paa it grönt furutræ (Hamar's coat of arms was a black grouse with outspread wings at the top of a green pine). The chronicle says that this coat of arms was carved into the woodwork over the town hall in the old marketplace.
