= Mörby =

Mörby is the name of several localities in Sweden:

- Mörby, Danderyd Municipality, Stockholm County
  - Mörby centrum, a shopping mall
  - Mörby centrum metro station
  - Mörby railway station, on Roslagsbanan
- Mörby, Ekerö Municipality, Stockholm County

== See also ==
- Moreby Hall, a Grade II*-listed manor house and estate in Stillingfleet, North Yorkshire, England
