= Torup Castle =

Castle in Svedala Municipality, Scania, Sweden

- Torups slott
- Svedala Municipality
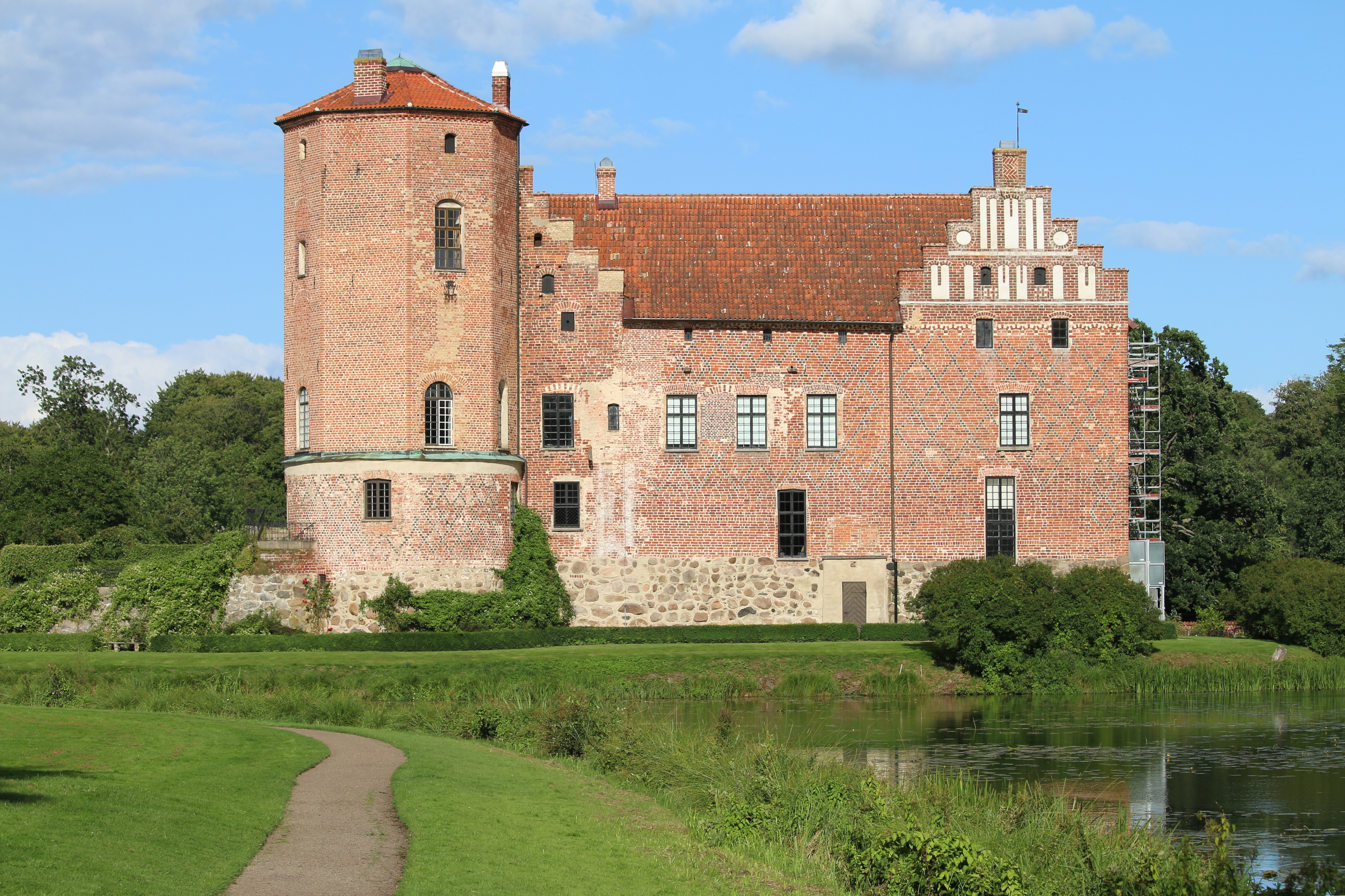
- Torup Castle

Site information
- Type: Castle
- Owner: Malmö Municipality
- Open to the public: Yes, scheduled tours

Location
- Scania, Sweden
- Coordinates: 55.565278°N 13.208611°E

Site history
- Built: 1537; 489 years ago

Torup Castle (Swedish: Torups slott) is a castle in Svedala Municipality, Scania, in southern Sweden. It is situated approximately 15 kilometres (9.3 mi) east of Malmö and 2 kilometres (1.2 mi) south of Bara. It was constructed in 1537 by Görvel Fadersdotter (Sparre) for her son and its current Renaissance design dates back to the early 17th century. Since the 19th century, the castle and its grounds have been a destination for Malmö residents, leading to its purchase by Malmö municipality in 1970 to preserve its value as a recreational and natural resource.

The castle is a three-story brick building. It forms a square with an octagonal tower in the northwest and a round one in the southeast corner. It is located within the Torup beech forest (Torups bokskog), a 340 hectares (840 acres) recreational area, of which 180 hectares (440 acres) have been a part of a nature reserve since 2019. The castle's grounds are freely accessible to the public, while guided tours of Torup Castle are available to the public on a limited basis.

Studies have highlighted the recreational value of Torup's grounds. Research on willingness to pay for access to the area indicated an annual average value of approximately kr 2,000 per visitor in 2014, emphasizing the importance of Torup as a cherished local resource.

== History ==
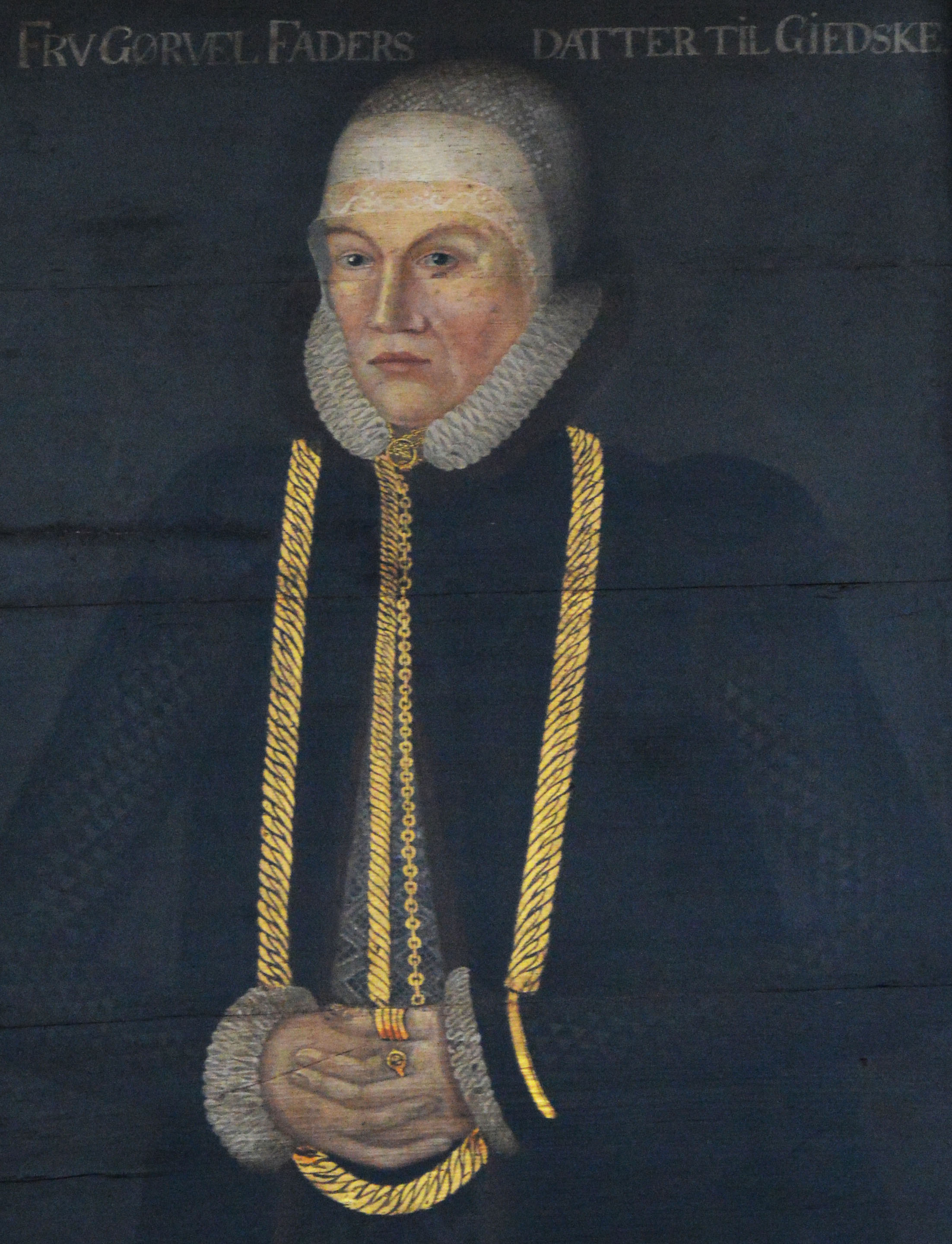
Görvel Fadersdotter

Torup Castle has a rich history dating back to the 14th century. The original fortress was situated on a hill known as Askebacken, located just north of the current stables and barns. The current castle was constructed in 1537 by Görvel Fadersdotter (Sparre), one of the wealthiest women of her time. She built the castle at Torup with the intention that it would serve as a residence for her son, Nils Ulfstand. Tragically, Nils died during a journey to Germany at the age of thirteen, leaving Görvel without direct heirs.

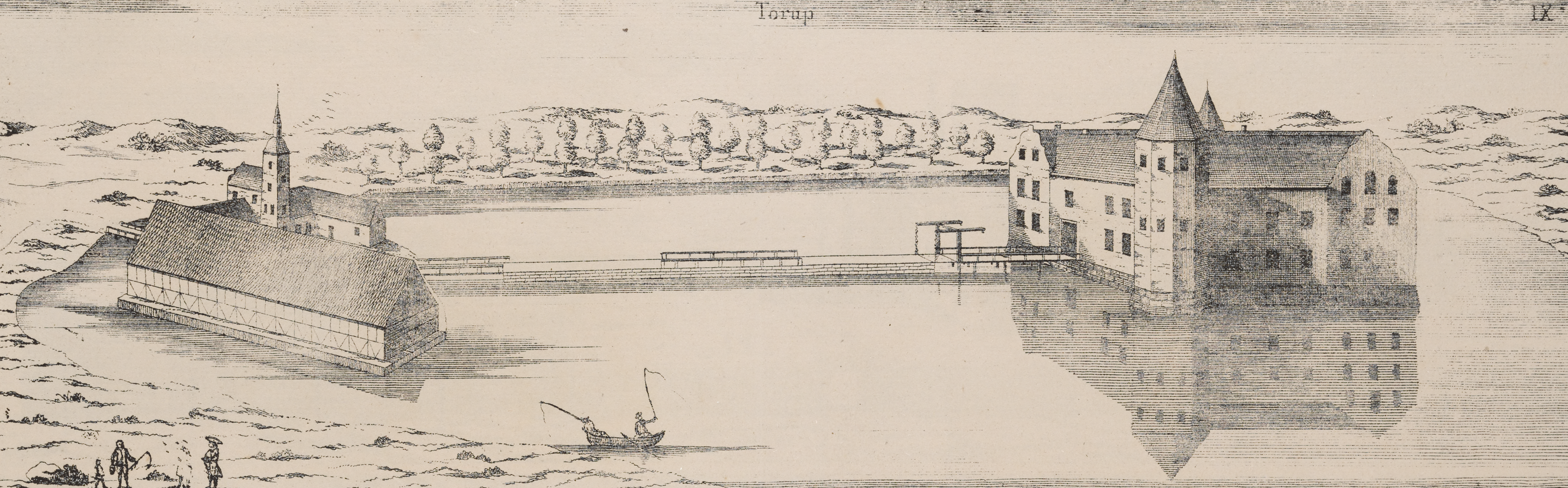
Torup Castle in 1680, after the dam's construction

After her son's death, Görvel Fadersdotter retained ownership of Torup Castle, even after the passing of her husband, Truid Gregersen Ulfstand. Following her death in 1605, her extensive estates were left to the Danish crown, and were inherited by King Christian IV, despite competing claims from other families. Between 1602 and 1630, the castle underwent significant restoration, acquiring its current architectural appearance.

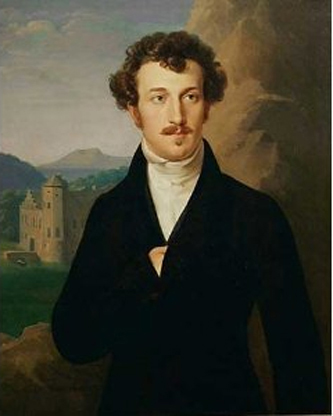
Franz Schubert’s friend Schober in front of the castle (his birthplace in 1796)

The castle would eventually pass into the hands of Sigvard Grubbe, who owned the castle until his death in 1636. During this period, Torup was frequently visited by Christian IV. The king ordered soldiers to construct a dam around the lake in which the castle was situated, though the lake was eventually drained in 1775.

The estate changed hands several times. In 1647, it was acquired by Corfitz Ulfeldt but was confiscated by the Swedish Crown in 1660. In 1735, it was returned to Ulfeldt's grandson, J. Beck (later Beck-Friis). The property later passed to the Stjernblad family before being purchased in 1812 by Court Marshal Baron Gustaf Julius Coyet. Coyet restored the deteriorating castle, enhanced the estate's beauty, and modernized its operations. By the late 19th and early 20th centuries, Torup Castle had become a gathering place for Sweden’s cultural and scientific elite under the Coyet family’s ownership. Its popularity was bolstered by a restaurant, a dance pavilion, and a railway spur connecting the area to the Malmö–Genarp railway.

In 1970, the estate was acquired by Malmö municipality, including the castle, surrounding buildings, parklands, beech forests, and farmland. The city committed to preserving the estate in line with the traditions of its previous owners, encapsulated by the motto: "Söken bevara vad I haven fått" ("Seek to preserve what you have been given"). The last private residents left in 2012, after which Malmö City made much of the castle park accessible to the public.

== Grounds and surroundings ==
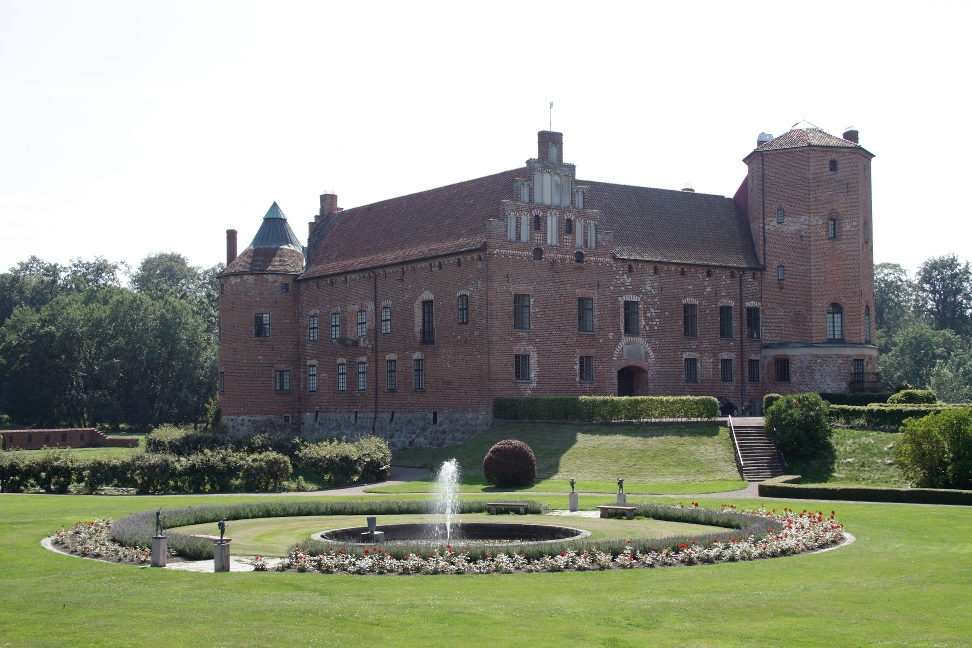
Torup Castle from northeast

The beech forest surrounding Torup Castle is notable for its ecological richness, particularly its ancient trees and abundant deadwood, which support a high biodiversity. The forest is home to one of Skåne's most diverse populations of wood-dwelling insects, as well as an array of bats and ground fungi species.

The grounds around Torup Castle offer a variety of activities, including hiking, jogging, cycling, horseback riding, and barbecuing. There are several trails and paths ranging from 2 kilometres (1.2 mi) to 10 kilometres (6.2 mi), as well as themed walking routes, riding trails, and cycling tracks. Facilities include a visitor center (Friluftsgården), which hosts a café, nature exhibitions, fitness amenities and two wind shelters for overnight stays, with designated areas for grilling.

Adjacent to the forest, the castle and its surrounding village (Torups by) feature the Stallarna meeting place, the event venue Stenladan, and the educational exhibit Expo Torup. Nearby attractions include the Statarmuseet and Bokskogens Golf Club.

== Gallery ==
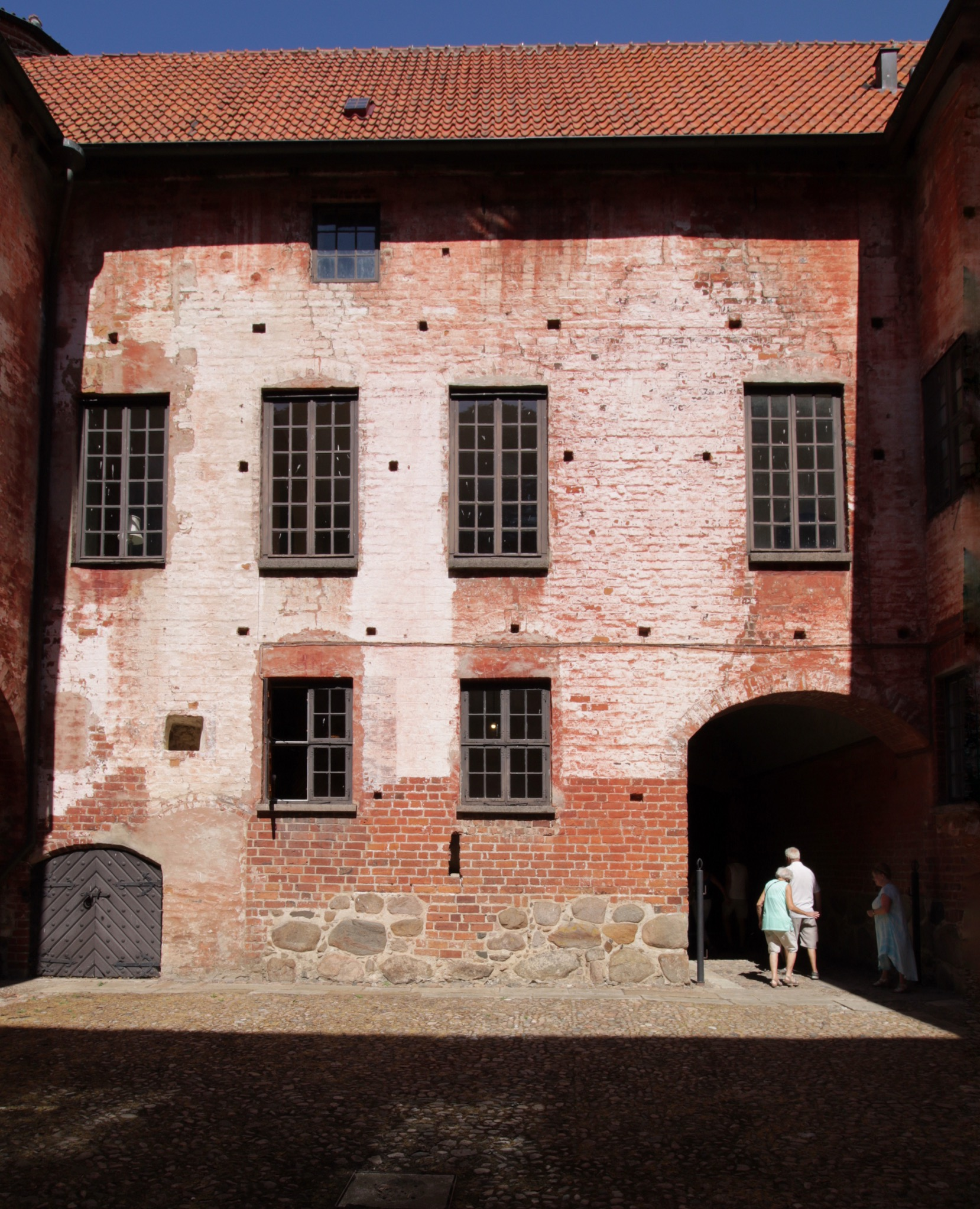
Inner courtyard

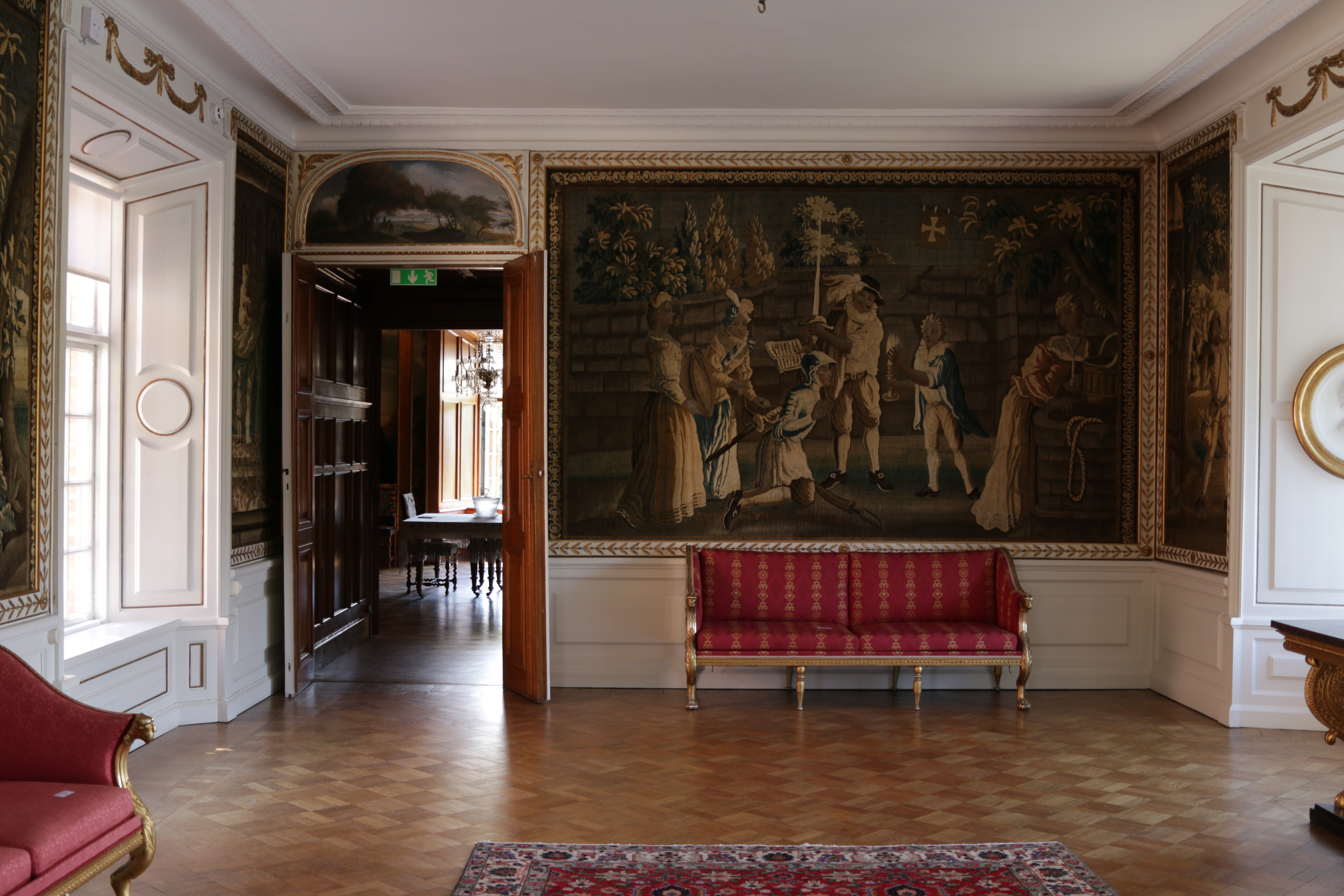
Interior

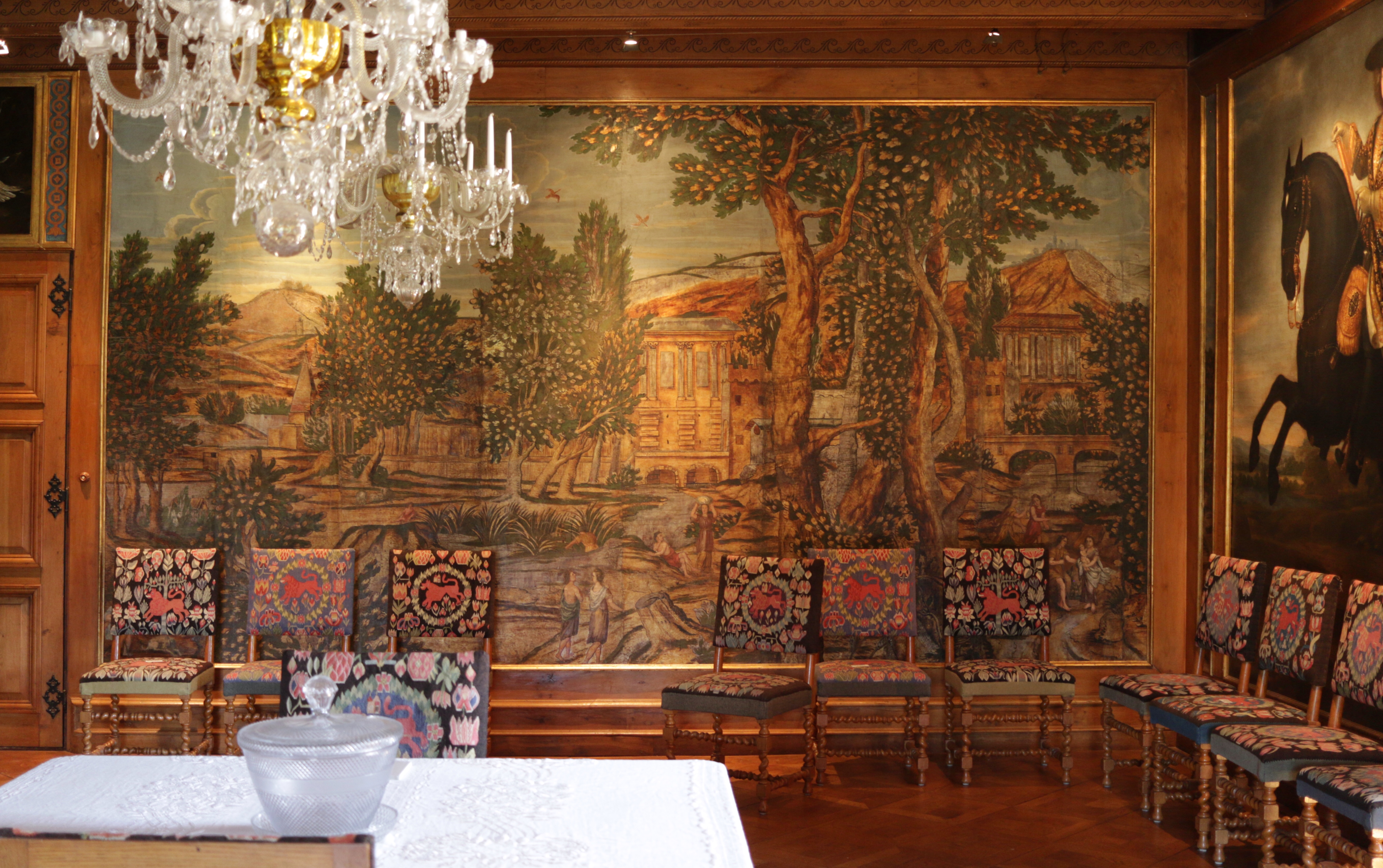
Interior

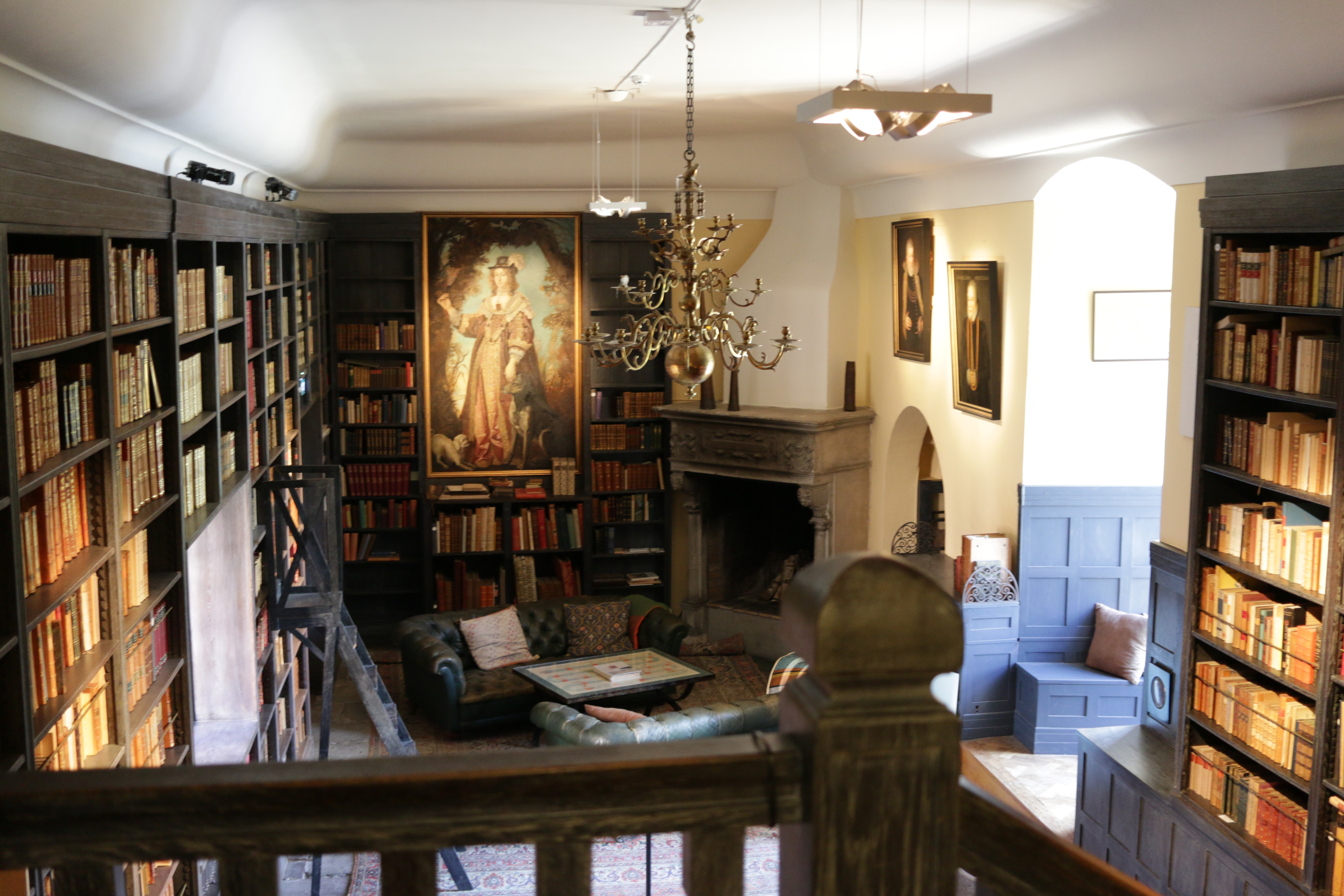
Library

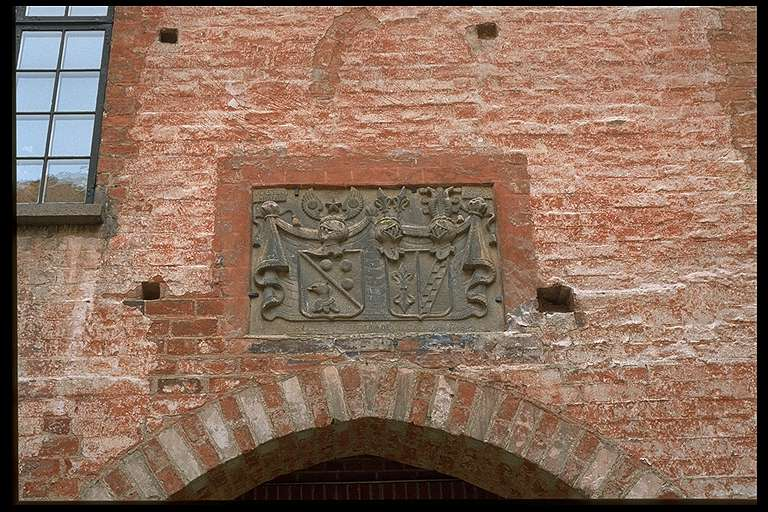
Coats of arms of Stiernblad and Beck-Friis families on castle wall

== See also ==
- List of castles in Sweden
