= Truid Ulfstand =

Danish nobleman, landowner and privy council member

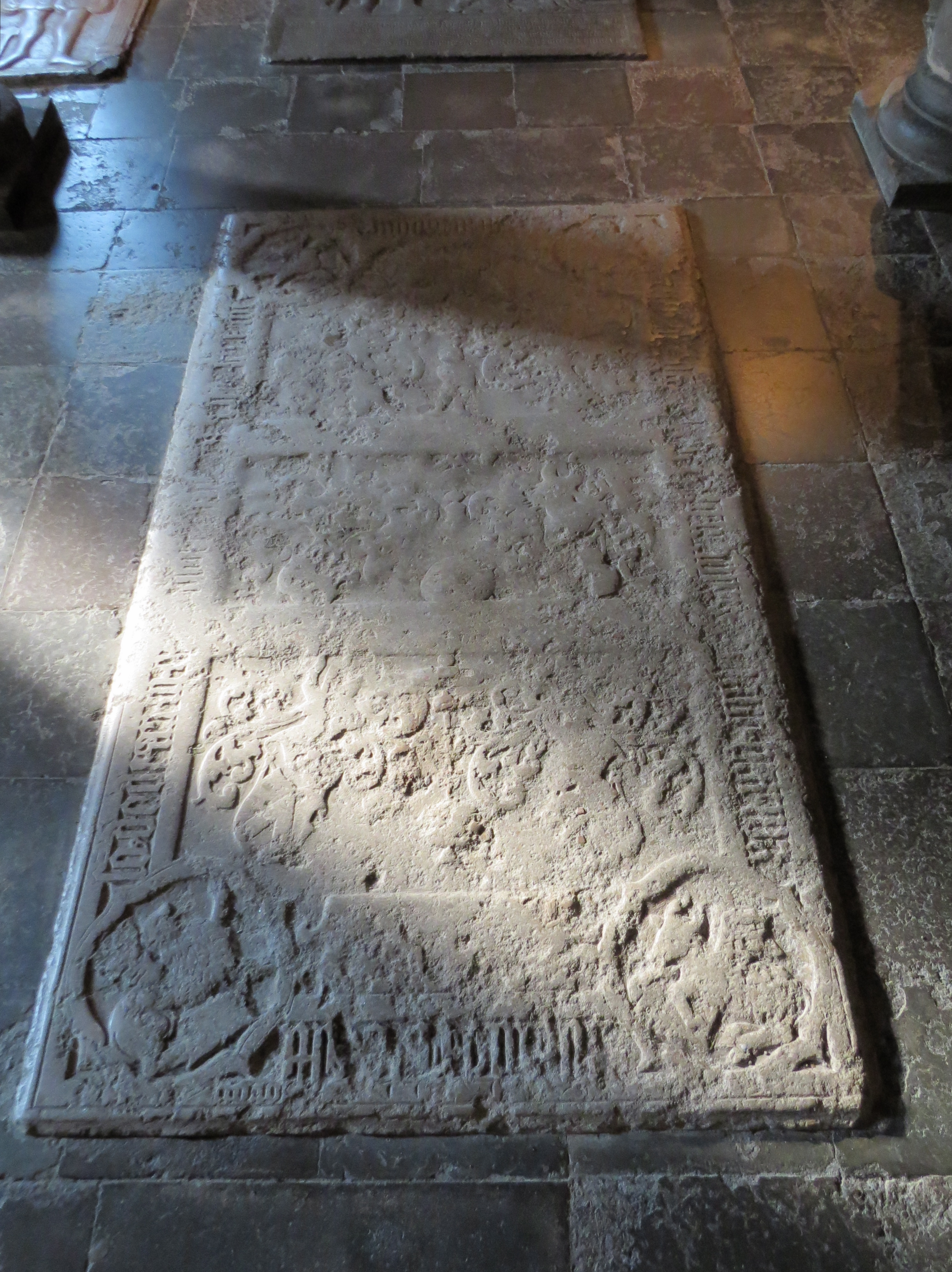
Truid Ulfstand's gravestone with the family coat of arms of his parents and wives in the crypt of Lund Cathedral. The inscription reads: her ligger begrauit oc salig wader truidor grerson wlstand ridd aff torop so døde an dm met tw.s ... kiere frwer ano d ni md ...

Truid Gregersen Ulfstand (1487 – November 16, 1545) was a Danish nobleman, landowner, and privy council member. He was active in Norway in the 1530s during the time that the country was entering into a real union with Denmark, and was a commander in the Danish civil war known as The Count's Feud.

== Background ==
Ulfstand was the son of the fief-holder Gregers Jepsen til Torup and Else Torbernsdatter Bille, and the brother of Holger Gregersen Ulfstand. He inherited the Torup estate in Scania from his father. He married Ide Brock around 1520, and they had four sons and three daughters. In 1522 he was endowed with Varberg Fortress, which he held until his death. He was admitted to the privy council upon the enthronement of Frederick I, and he was made a knight upon Frederick's coronation in 1524.

== In Frederick's service ==
In 1531, Ulfstand participated in the negotiations on Christian II's fate in Copenhagen before he was sent to Norway in 1532, together with Claus Bille to bring the country under King Frederick. In Oslo, they held assemblies with the country's inhabitants and succeeded in having the leaders recognize the king. Later they went to Trondheim, where they reached an agreement with Archbishop Olav Engelbrektsson.

Ulfstand's first wife died in 1531 or 1532. During a stay in Stockholm, in 1534 he married again to a young widow, Görvel Fadersdotter (Sparre). He then went to Malmø, where he was held captive for nine weeks during Jørgen Knock's rebellion. He freed himself by swearing loyalty to Christopher, Count of Oldenburg on August 10 that year.

== Count's Feud ==
Following Ulfstand's captivity, King Gustav I of Sweden sent an army against Halland, which began a siege of Varberg Fortress on November 10, 1534. Ulfstand defended the fortress until his cousin Claus Bille arranged a ceasefire in exchange for Ulfstand declaring himself neutral.

After the Scania nobility went over to the Swedes, Marcus Meyer was sent to Ulfstand at Varberg. Meyer entered into a secret agreement with the city's inhabitants to overwhelm the fortress. This was successful on March 12, 1535; Ulfstand managed to escape, but his wife and children were taken prisoner. He now opened supported Duke Christian and he assembled a small army that besieged Varberg. On Pentecost 1536, Christian sent reinforcements. Marcus Meyer was forced to surrender and was beheaded on August 17, 1536 at Helsingør.

== Later life ==
In 1537 Ulfstand was once again sent to Norway, this time to bring the country under the leadership of King Christian III. He first went to Trondheim and negotiated the terms of surrender with the soldiers at Steinvikholm Castle, after the Siege of Steinvikholm. He then went down to Hamar, where he headed the Danish-German troops at the Siege of Hamar and arrested Bishop Mogens Lauritssøn. He made a new journey to Norway in 1539, to introduce Norway's first Lutheran Church Ordinance.

Ulfstand died at Torup on November 16, 1545 and is buried in Lund Cathedral in Scania.
