= Bakke Abbey =

Former abbey in Trondheim, Norway

Coordinates: 63°25′57.59″N 10°24′38.38″E

Bakke Abbey was a medieval nunnery in Trondheim in Norway.

== History ==
=== Nunnery ===
Bakke Abbey was founded not later than 1150 and possibly quite a long time earlier. It is not definitely known to which order the nuns belonged, but it seems likely that they were Benedictines.

The nunnery was dissolved in 1537 in the course of the Reformation, although the nuns seem to have continued to live there for some years afterwards: the last abbess died in 1561. The buildings were burnt down by the Swedish Army in 1564, during the Northern Seven Years' War.

=== After dissolution ===
The site was replaced by a farm known as Bakke gård and is now occupied by the properties between Innherredsveien 3 and Kirkegata.

During work in a cellar in 1971, remains of walls were discovered. These seem to be from the north wall of the church, with the transept and a chapel. To the north of this, graves have been discovered. No traces have been found of the conventual buildings, which are assumed to have occupied the area to the south of the church.

== Sources ==
- Norges klostre i middelalderen: Bakke kloster (in Norwegian)
