= Siege of Steinvikholm (1537) =

1537 siege in Stjørdal, Norway

- Part of Olav Engelbrektsson's rebellion and the Protestant Reformation
Date	April 1537 – 17 May 1537
Location	Steinvikholm Castle in Stjørdalen, Norway 63°32′38″N 10°48′48″E
Result	Protestant victory

Belligerents
Norwegian Catholics	Denmark; Norwegian Protestants

Commanders and leaders
Deacon Knud Pederson Skanke	(Denmark) Tord Roed

Strength
Unknown (maybe around 100)	Unknown (maybe around 300–400)

Casualties and losses
Unknown	Unknown

The siege of Steinvikholm was a siege of Steinvikholm Castle in Stjørdalen, Norway (in the Skatval area in the present day Stjørdal Municipality). The siege was between the forces of the Catholic Deacon Knud Pederson Skanke and noble Tord Roed.

The siege started in April after the Archbishop of Norway Olav Engelbrektsson had fled the country. The protestant forces laid siege to the castle and did a naval blockade of the fjord. The defenders fired their canons at the besiegers day and night, and refused several request to surrender to the protestant forces. But the defenders surrendered on 17 May. The reason was that the defenders heard a rumour that the noble Truid Ulfstand was on his way to Trondheim from Denmark with a force of 1500 men. The defenders stipulated for there surrender that; non of the defenders where to be punished after the surrender, and be pardoned for there involvement in the rebellion. Knud Pederson Skanke was to keep all his possessions he had at the castle, and keep his position as deacon.

== Aftermath ==
All the demands were accepted by the besiegers, and the stipulations were formally accepted by the nobles Truid Ulfstand and Christoffer Huitfeldt on 29 May. After this the catholics were subdued in Trøndelag and Northern Norway. The only resistance left was in the northern part of Eastern Norway. In June, Truid Ulfstand invaded that part of the country and laid siege to Hamarhus.

== See also ==
- Reformation in Norway
- Siege of Hamar
