= William Framyngham =

English author

William Framyngham (1512–1537), was an English writer.

== Life ==
Framyngham was born in February 1512 at Norwich, and educated at the grammar school, where he was a contemporary of John Caius. From Norwich he went to Cambridge University, and was at first at Pembroke Hall and afterwards at Queens' College, 'in aula Pembrokiana per adolescentiam educatus, per juventutem in Collegium reginale ascitus.' He proceeded B.A. 1530, M.A. 1533, and was fellow of Queens' College from 1530 till his death, and bursar for three years from 1534. He died 25 Sept. 1537, leaving all his books to his friend and schoolfellow Dr. John Caius. Caius described his friend as "homo tenacissimæ memoriæ, fœcundi ingenii, infinitæ lectionis, indefatigati laboris atque diligentiæ".

== Works ==
John Caius tells us that along with Framyngham he wrote Scholia and notes upon them, but could never recover them from those in whose care he left them when he went to Italy. Long afterwards, in 1570, Edmund Gheast, bishop of Rochester, professed to know of them, but Caius apparently did not follow up the clue. Caius gives the following list of Framyngham's works:

- De Continentia lib. ii. (prose).
- De Consolatione ad Æmilianum cæcum lib. i. (verse; suggested by the author's blindness, brought on by immoderate study).
- D. Laurentii Martyrium (verse).
- Εκπύ-ρωσις, sive Incendium Sodomorum (verse).
- Idololatria (verse).
- Άρέτη, sive in laudem virtutis (verse).
- Epigrammatum lib. ii.
