= John Almond (monk) =

- Confessor of the Faith

Personal details
- Born: c.1509 Cheshire, England
- Died: April 18, 1585 Hull Castle, England
- Occupation: Cistercian monk

John Almond (c.1509 – 18 April 1585) was a Cistercian monk. He is commemorated as a Confessor of the Faith in the Roman Catholic Church, and his name has been included in the supplementary process of the English Martyrs.

He came from Cheshire, and was a monk in the time of Henry VIII, but neither his abbey nor his fate during and after its suppression have been identified.

In 1579 he was imprisoned at Hull Castle. The ground-floor of the South Blockhouse was often used for this purpose. Conditions were particularly poor, with contemporary accounts noting that the quarters "have been overflowed with water at high tide..."

He died in prison on 18 April 1585; he was about 76 years old. According to John Hungerford Pollen, the old priest "...after many sufferings in prison, was left in extreme age to pine away under a neglect that was revolting."
