= Mörby, Ekerö Municipality =

Mörby, Ekerö kommun
- Smaller locality
- Interactive map of Mörby, Ekerö kommun
- Coordinates: 59°19′32.84″N 17°46′19.26″E
- Country: Sweden
- County: Stockholm County
- Municipality: Ekerö Municipality
- Time zone: UTC+1 (CET)
  - Summer (DST): UTC+2 (CEST)

Mörby, Ekerö kommun is a village (smaller locality) in Ekerö Municipality, Stockholm County, southeastern Sweden.
