= Steinvikholm Castle =

Island fortress in Skatval, Nord-Trøndelag, Norway

- Skatval, Trøndelag, Norway

Site information
- Type: Star fort
- Controlled by: Norway (1524-1537); Denmark-Norway (1537-1814); Norway (1814-1940); Nazi Germany (1940-1945); Norway (1945-present)

Location
- Coordinates: 63°32′37″N 10°48′47″E

Site history
- Built: 1524-1532
- In use: 1532-1575
- Battles/wars: Siege of Steinvikholm (1537); Northern Seven Years' War

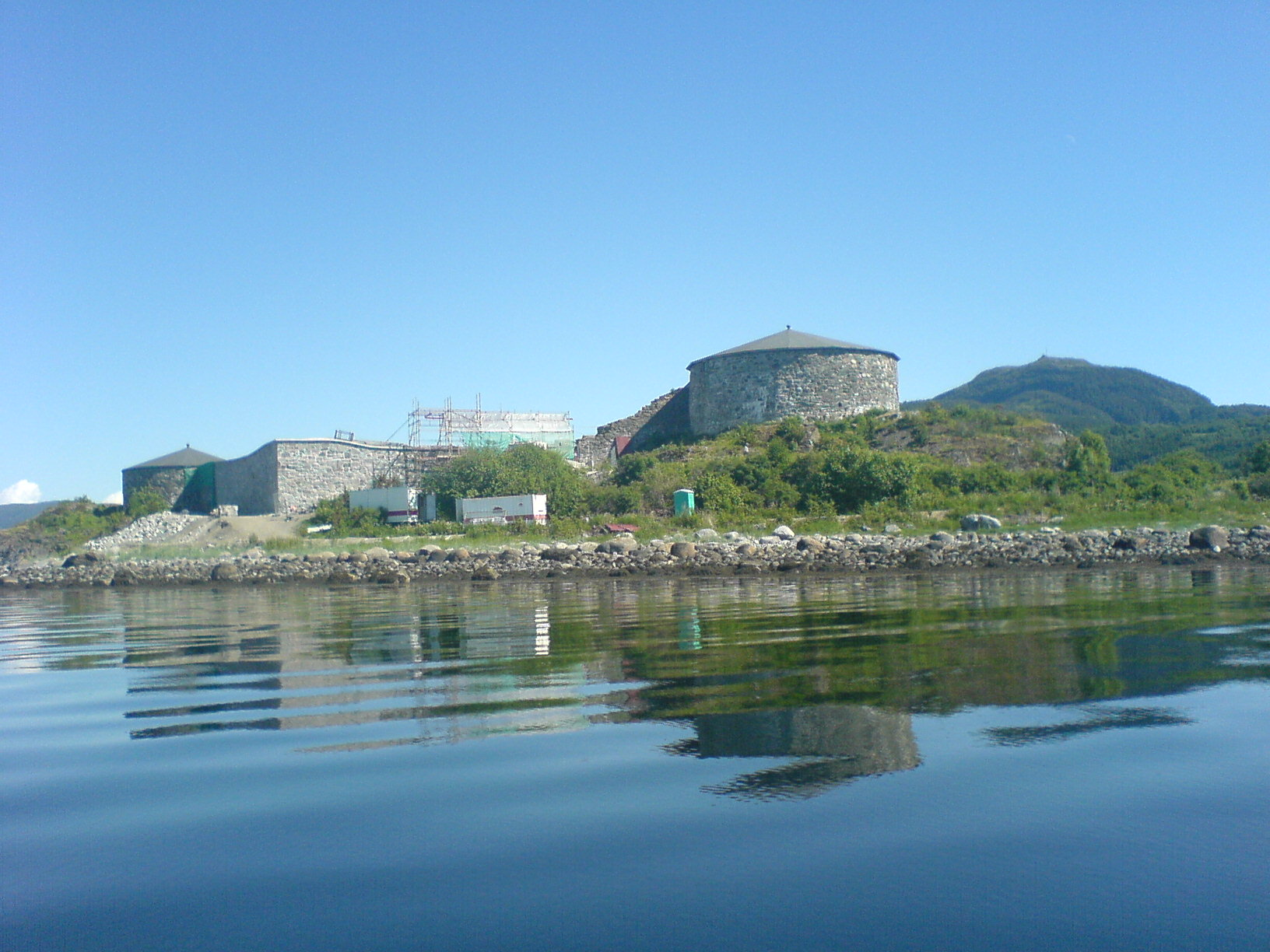
Steinvikholm Castle (Steinvikholm slott)

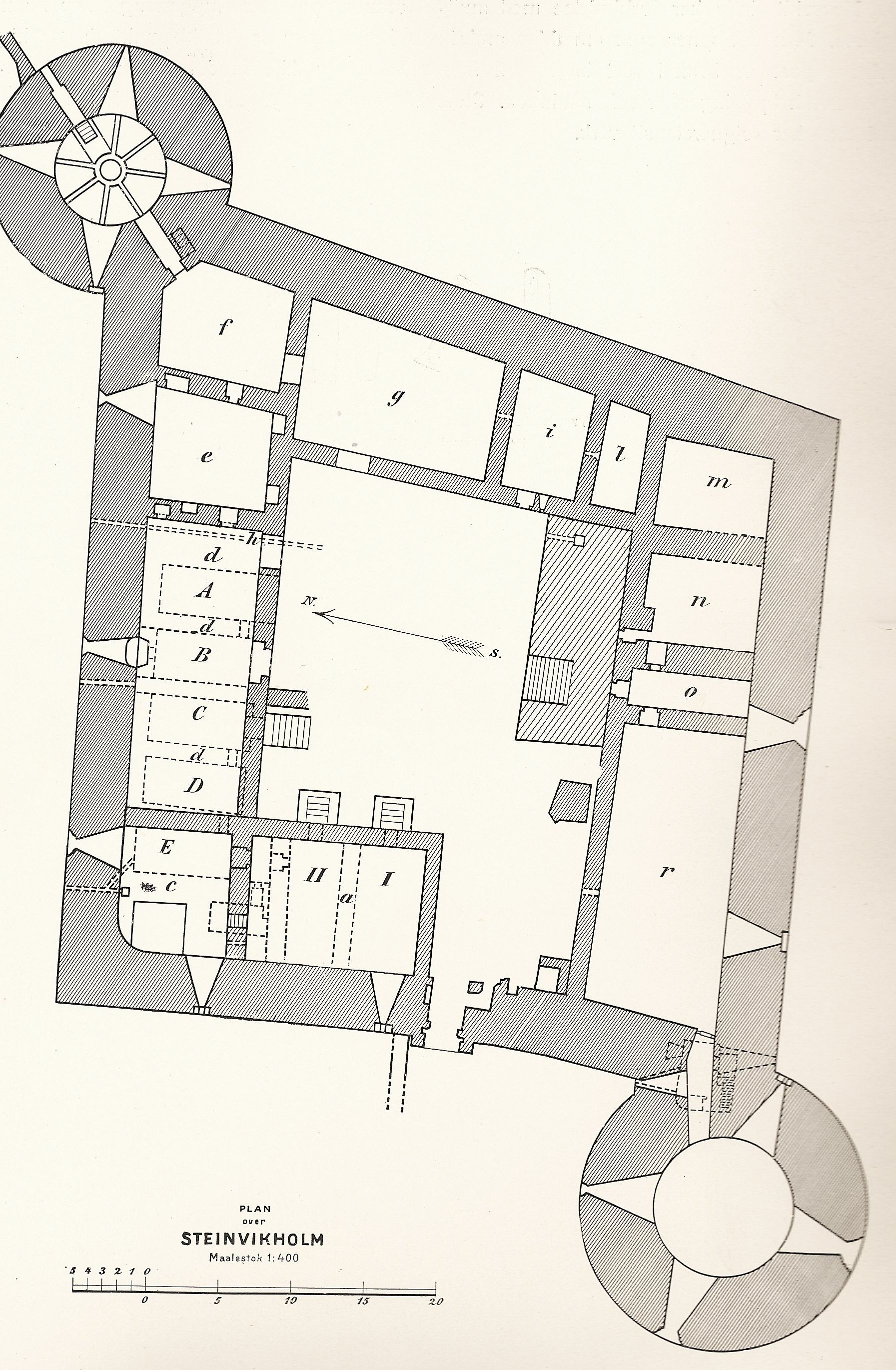
First story floor plan of the Steinvikholm

Steinvikholm Castle (Norwegian: Steinvikholm slott) is an island fortress on the Skatval peninsula in the present-day Stjørdal Municipality in Trøndelag county, Norway. The castle was built over seven years, from 1525 to 1532, by Norway's last Roman Catholic Archbishop, Olav Engelbrektsson. Steinvikholm castle became a powerful fortification by the time it was built, and it is the largest construction raised in the Norwegian Middle Ages.

== Castle ==
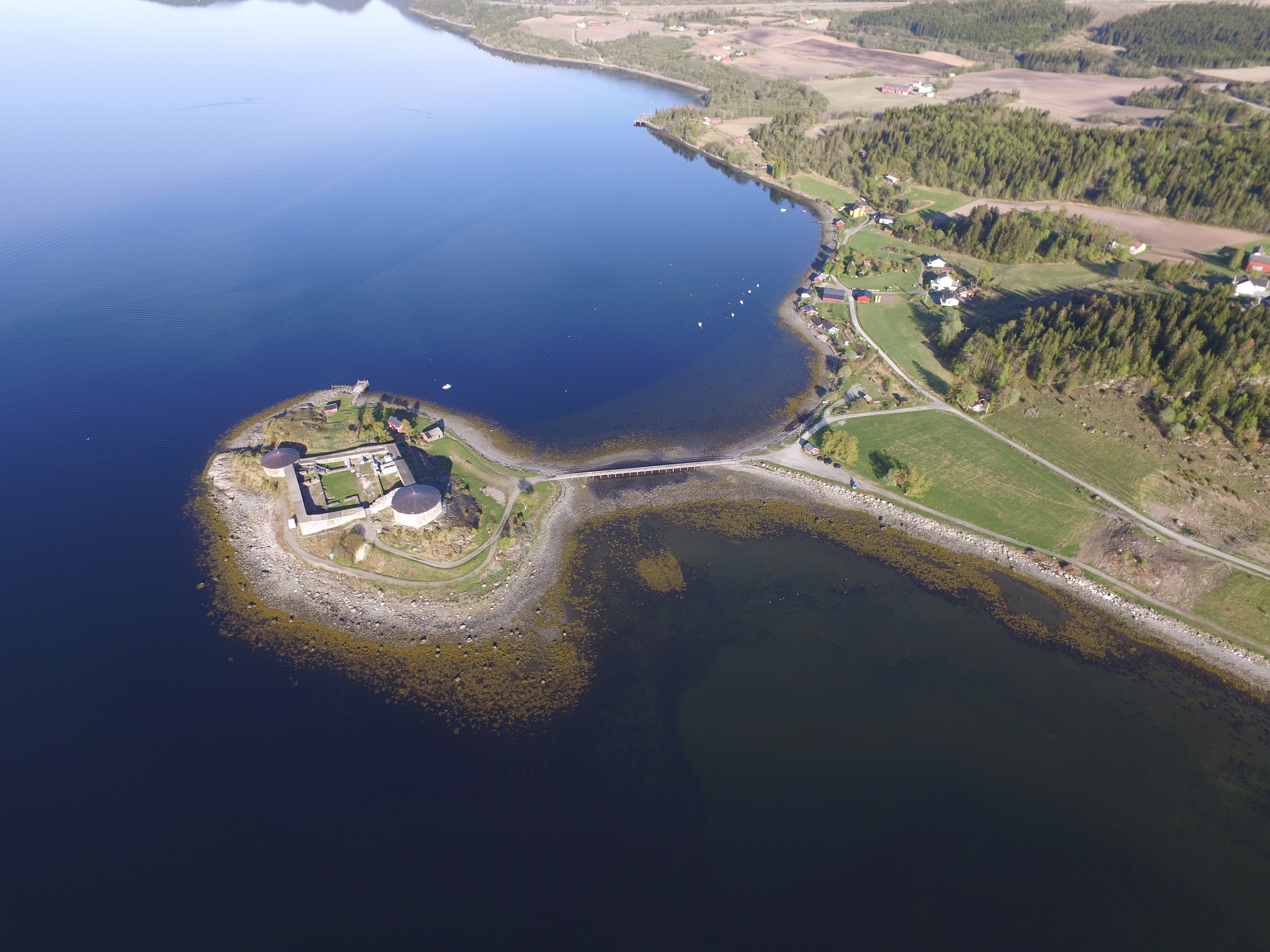
Steinvikholm on Skatval

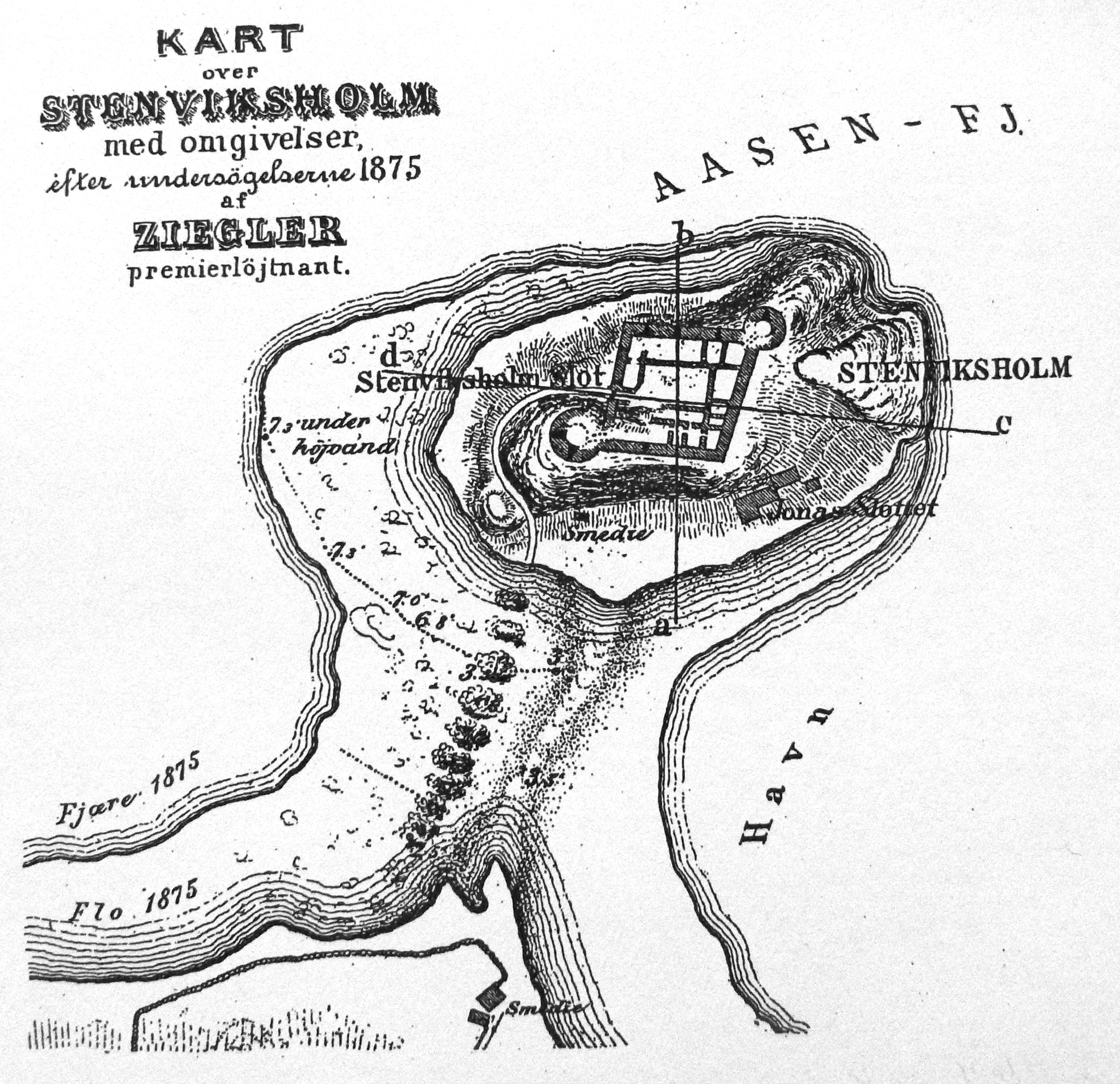
Topographic plan of Steinvikholm from 1875

The castle occupies about half of the land on the rocky island. The absence of a spring meant that fresh water had to be brought from the mainland. A wooden bridge served as the only way to the island other than boat. Although the castle design was common across Europe in 1525, its medieval design was becoming obsolete because of the improved siege firepower offered by gunpowder and cannons.

== History ==
The castle was constructed at the instruction of Olav Engelbrektsson (c. 1480– 1538), Archbishop of the Diocese of Nidaros. Construction started after his return from a meeting with the Pope in Rome, presumably in anticipation of impending military-religious conflict.

As Archbishop Engelbrektsson's resistance to the encroachment of Danish rule escalated, first with King Frederick I of Denmark and his successor King Christian III of Denmark, Steinvikholm Castle and Nidarholm Abbey became the Roman Catholic Church's military strongholds in Norway. In April 1537, the Danish-Norwegian Reformation succeeded in driving the archbishop from the castle into exile at Lier in the Netherlands (now in Belgium), where he died on 7 February 1538. At the castle the archbishop left behind St. Olav's shrine and other treasures from Nidaros Cathedral (Trondheim). The original coffin containing St. Olav's body remained at Steinvikholm until it was returned to Nidaros Cathedral in 1564. Since 1568, the site of St. Olav's grave in Nidaros has been unknown.

From the 17th to 19th century, the island was used as a quarry and some of its masonry was sold and removed from the site. This activity was condoned by the Danish-Norwegian authorities as a way of eliminating a monument to the opposition of the Danish–Norwegian Union.

== Modern usage ==
Steinvikholm Fort is owned and operated today by the Society for the Preservation of Norwegian Ancient Monuments (Fortidsminneforeningen).

The island has been the site of the midnight opera, Olav Engelbrektsson, which details the life and struggles of the archbishop. The opera is held in August annually with libretto by Edvard Hoem and music by Henning Sommerro. The opera has been organized by Steinvikholm Musikkteater (now Opera Trøndelag) since the beginning in 1993.

== Gallery ==
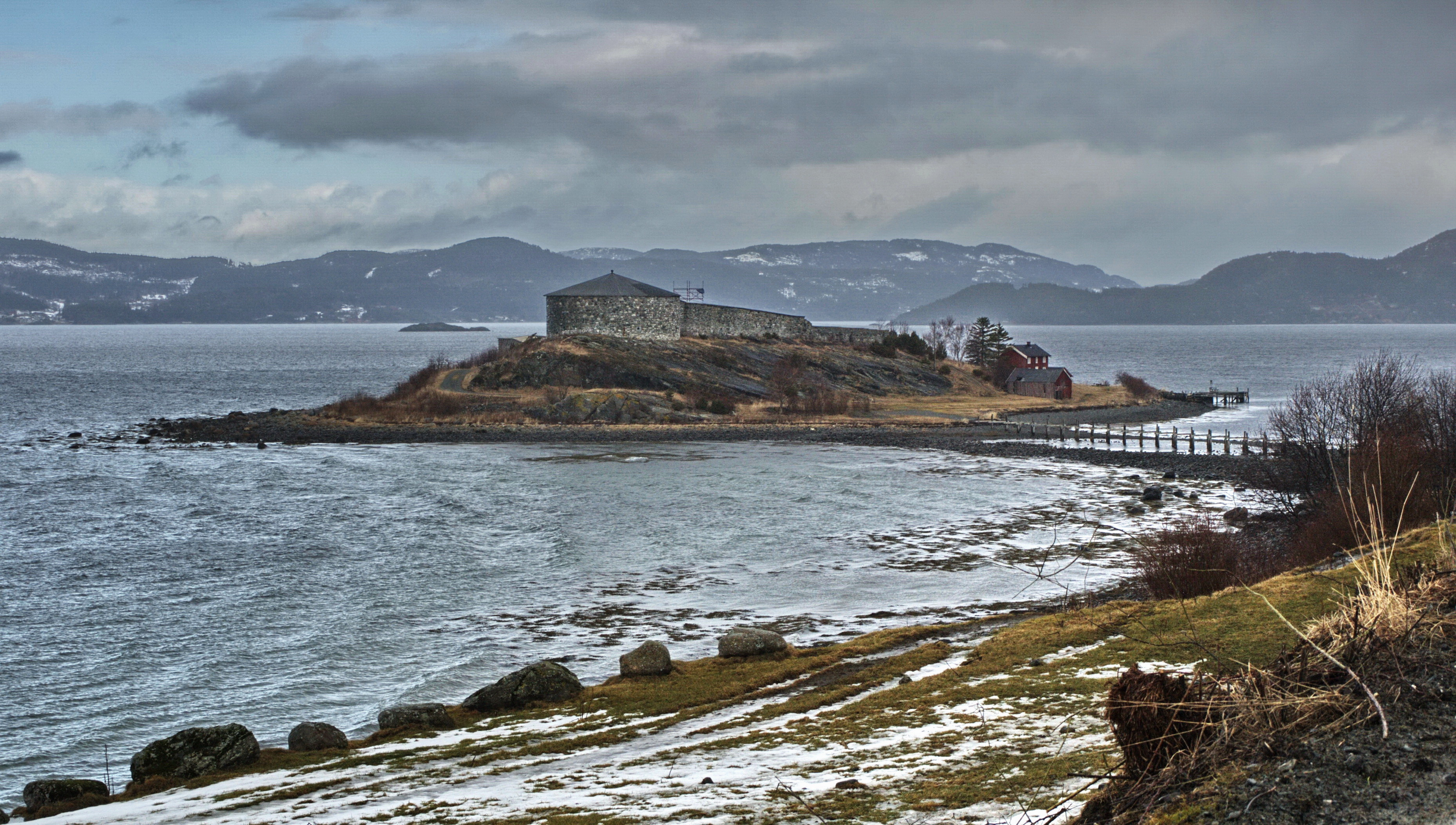
Steinvikholmen fort

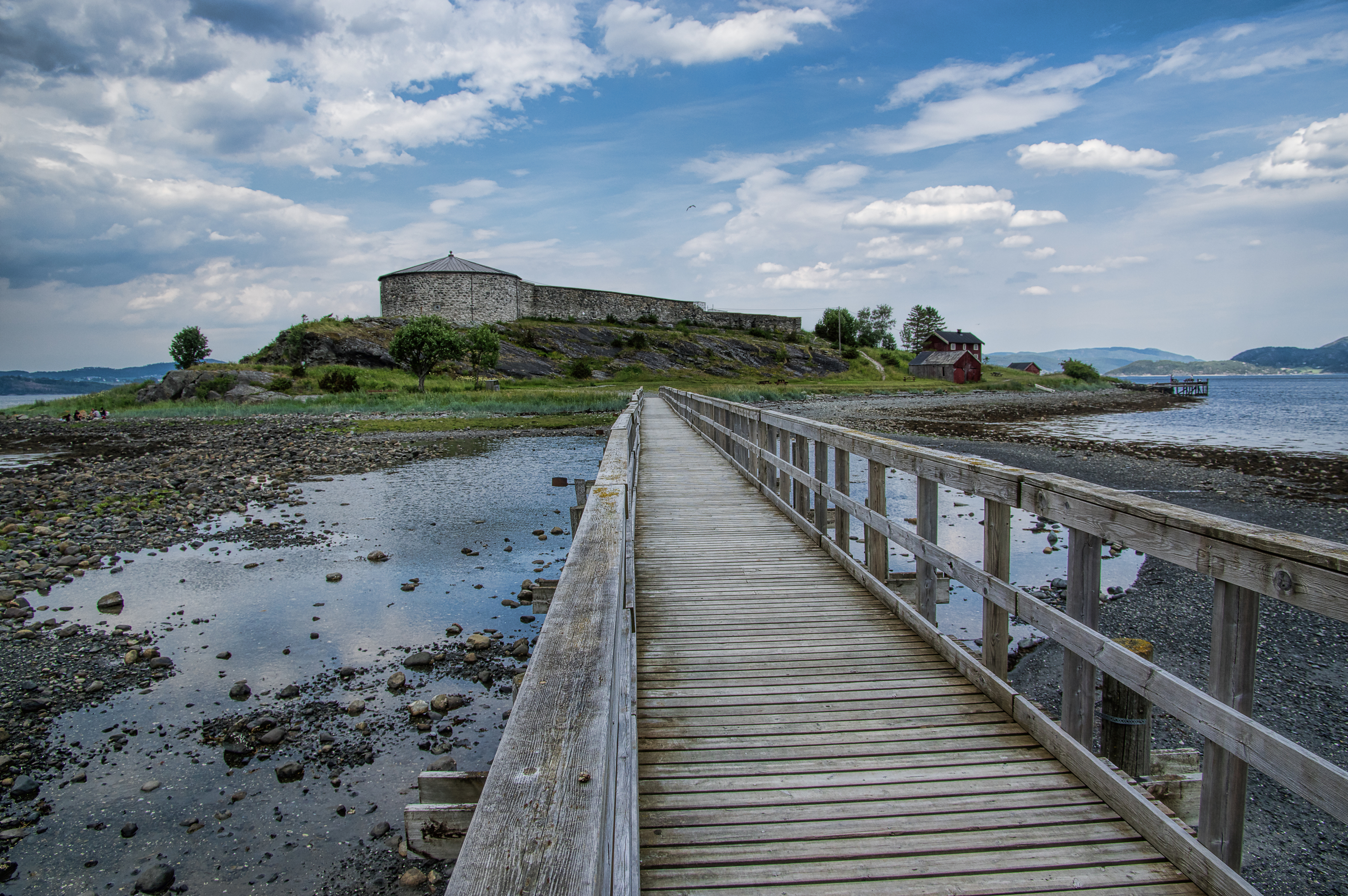
Bridge to Steinvikholm

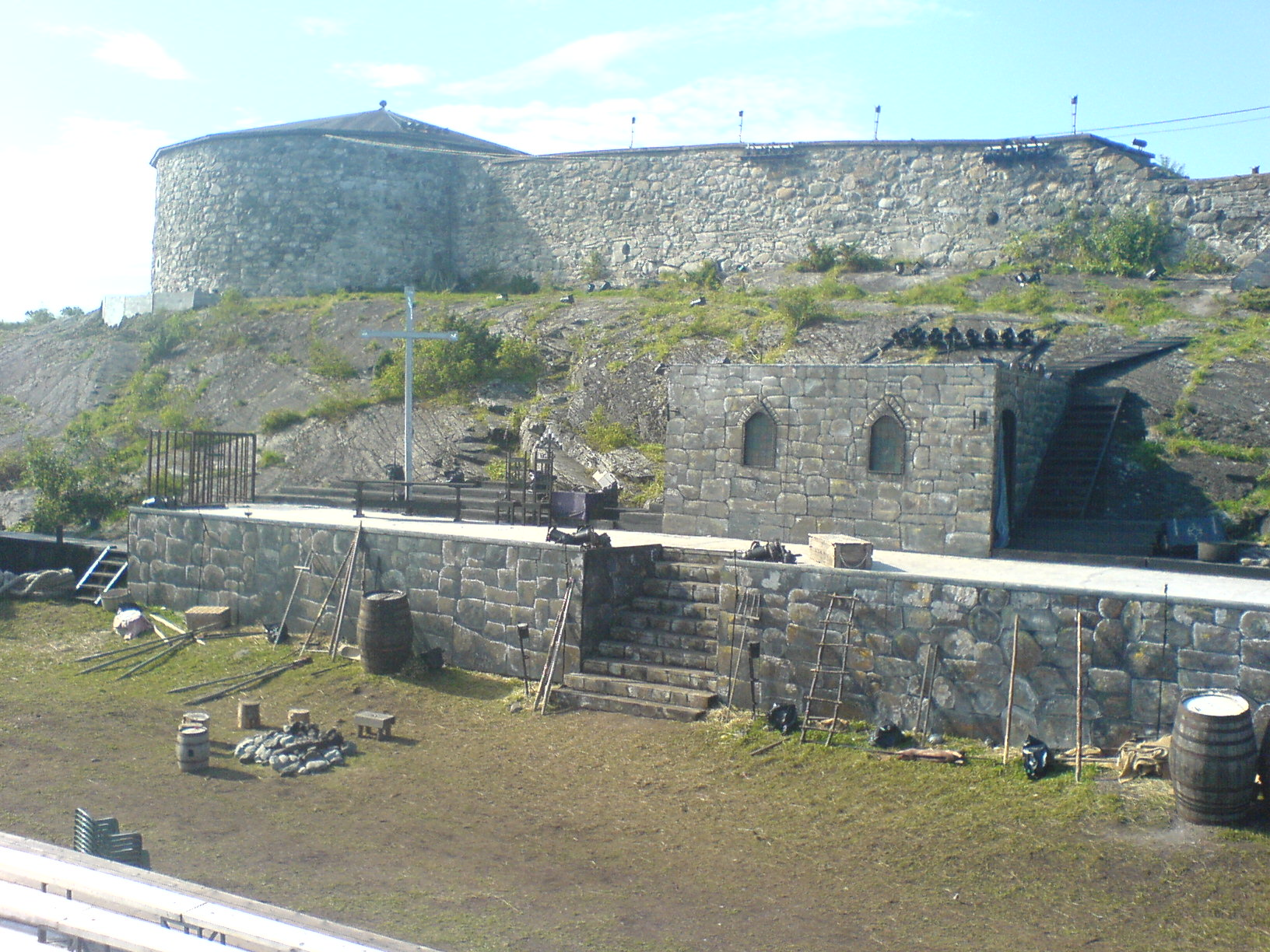
Site of the opera of Olav Engelbrektsson

== See also ==
- Religion in Norway
- Siege of Steinvikholm (1537)

== Other sources ==
- Hoem, Edvard (2006) Kom fram, fryste! (Oslo: Aschehoug Agency Publishers)
