= Mogens Lauritssøn =

Mogens Lauritssøn, also known as Magnus Lauretii (died 3 October 1542, Antvorskov Monastery, Zealand, Denmark), was the 27th and last Roman Catholic Bishop of Hamar.

== Background ==
Nothing is known about the origins of Mogens Lauritssøn. But he is known to have graduated from the University of Rostock in Germany on 17 April 1494 with a degree of magister, that is, doctor. He later became a canon in Oslo and, by 1497, the archpriest of the Cathedral Chapter of Oslo. On 28 January 1513, he was already mentioned as the Electus so the election of the new Bishop of Hamar must have happened either in late 1512 or early 1513. He was still the Electus on 15 July 1513, when he attended a meeting in Copenhagen, but, 12 days later, on 22 July, he was the Bishop. Apparently his consecration must have been performed in Copenhagen between 15 and 22 July 1513.

== The Bishop of Hamar ==
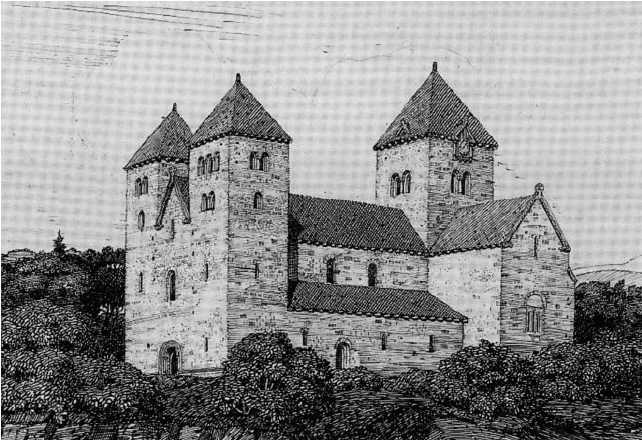
The Cathedral of Hamar, in a drawing by Olaf Nordhagen (1883–1925).

Of Mogens Lauritssøn, Anton Christian Bang, the Norwegian historian, gave him only a short paragraph in his 1912 book, Den Norske kirkes historie (The History of the Norwegian Church), and remarked:

"He apparently was not without zeal in his office; at any case, he seemed to have frequently gone out on his visitations in his sprawling diocese. He also seemed to be a good man and an ordinary administrator. But, by nature, he was weak and, concerning his abilities, he had certainly not done in this way anything out of the ordinary." (Han synes ikke at have været uden nidkjærhed i sit embede, ialfald sees han hyppig at have væaret ude paa visiatser i sit vidtstrakte bispedømme. Han synes ogsaa at have været en god mand og almindelig afholdt. Men af karakter var han svag, og havd dygtighed angaar, da hævede han sig i denne henseende vistnok ikke over det almindelige.)

But the Bishop of Hamar did have a part in the history of the centuries-long struggle for Norwegian independence. the Archbishop of Niðaros, Olav Engelbrektsson, the Primate of all Norway, and the Riksråd (National Council of Norway) wanted the new King of Denmark and Norway, Frederick I, to respect the independence of Norway so, if he wished to be elected as the King of Norway, he would have to sign their agreement. But, to draft the agreement themselves, they needed his permission to have their meetings in Norway. So, in 1524, the Archbishop sent Lauritssøn to Copenhagen to negotiate with the King. The Bishop was successful. A few months later, the King read and signed the agreement. He was elected as the King of Norway on 5 August 1524, two days before he was formally crowned as the King of Denmark in Copenhagen.

But Frederick I and most of his governors did not respect the agreement, especially in the face of the incoming Protestant Reformation. Eventually, the campaign for the independence of Norway withered until only Lauritssøn remained at the side of the Archbishop. Together, they supported Christian II against the latter's uncle, Frederick I, in the War of the Two Kings (1531–1532) and against Frederick's son, Christian III, in the Count's Feud (1534–1536) but Christian II lost each time. So the Bishop had to pay a hefty fine of 3,000 lodd ( 106 lbs. or 48 kg. ) of silver. Then the Reformation came.

== The Reformation ==
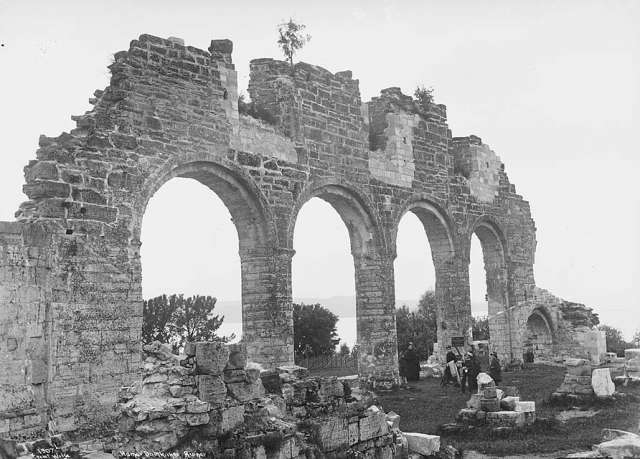
Ruins of the Cathedral of Hamar in the 1890s, photographed by Axel Lindahl ( 1841 – 1906 ).

In April 1537, to turn Norway into a Lutheran province/client kingdom, the new King of Denmark, Christian III, sent an army across the North Sea. His troops arrived at the Bergenhus Fortress in Bergen on 1 May 1537. Led by Truid Ulfstand, they headed for Niðaros but the Archbishop had already fled to exile in the Habsburg Netherlands. So they went after the remaining Bishops. One of them was the Bishop of Hamar.

According to Thomas Benjamin Willson, the British historian, Lauritssøn was ready to make a last stand so he had his palace prepared for a siege but, when he saw the forces of Ulfstand, he lost his courage. After an interview with the commander, the Bishop agreed to surrender so, on 23 June 1537, he left as a prisoner. Willson then narrated the "truly pathetic" scene of the departure with the English translation of Anton Christian Bang's Danish quotation:

"As Herr Truid and the bishop went together to Strandbakken, he fell on his knees and thanked God in heaven for every day he had lived. Then he bid good-night to the canons and the priests, then to his cathedral and cloister, then to his chief men, to the common people, both townsmen and bønder (landowners), entreating them all to pray heartily for him, and said he hoped he would soon come to them again. But added, 'O God our Heavenly Father, if not before, grant that we may meet one another in heaven.' This prayer he uttered with many tears and added, Vale! Vale! Vale! ('Farewell! Farewell! Farewell!')"

The Bishop never saw Hamar again. He was taken to Denmark, where he was kept as a prisoner, under medium security, at the Antvorskov Monastery. He died there on 3 October 1542.

Even at the end of his life he still had a few loyal followers. One of them, Karine Alvsdatter, a sister of Knut Alvsson and the heiress of the Grefsheim farm at Næs in Hedmark, tried to give, with a deed of gift, the Grefsheim farm with all its accessories to the Bishop but by then he was already dead so he was unable to accept the gift.

Today, 1271 yards (1162 meters) east of the ruins of the Hamar Cathedral and running to the shore, there is a street named Mogens gate (Mogens Street) in the memory of the Bishop.

== Bibliography ==
- (in Danish) A[nton]. Chr[istian]. Bang, Den Norske kirkes historie (The History of the Norwegian Church), Kristiania [now Oslo] and Copenhagen: Gyldendalske Boghandel Nordisk Forlag (Gyldendal Bookshop & Nordic Publishers), 1912, page 307.
- (in Danish) J. M. Hansen, Hamar og dets Biskopper (Hamar and Its Bishops), Hamar: Th. A. Hansens Bogtrykkeri, 1866, page 23
- (in Danish) [Jacob] Rudolph Keyser, Den norske kirkes historie under katholicismen, Andet Bind (The History of the Norwegian Church Under Catholicism, Second Volume), Christiania [now Oslo]: Chr. Tønsbergs Forlag, 1858, page 613.
- (in English) Thomas B[enjamin]. Willson, History of the Church and State in Norway from the Tenth Century to the Sixteenth Century, (Westminster: Archibald Constable & Co., Ltd., 1903), pages 346-347.
