= Mellbye =

Mellbye is a surname. Notable people with the surname include:

- Fredrik Mellbye (1917–1999), Norwegian physician
- Hilde Britt Mellbye (born 1961), Norwegian businesswoman
- Jan E. Mellbye (1913–2009), Norwegian farmer and politician
- Jens Christian Mellbye (1914–1993), Norwegian judge
- Johan E. Mellbye (1866–1954), Norwegian farmer and politician
