= Haugesund Municipality =

Municipality in Rogaland, Norway

Haugesund Municipality Haugesund kommune
- Municipality
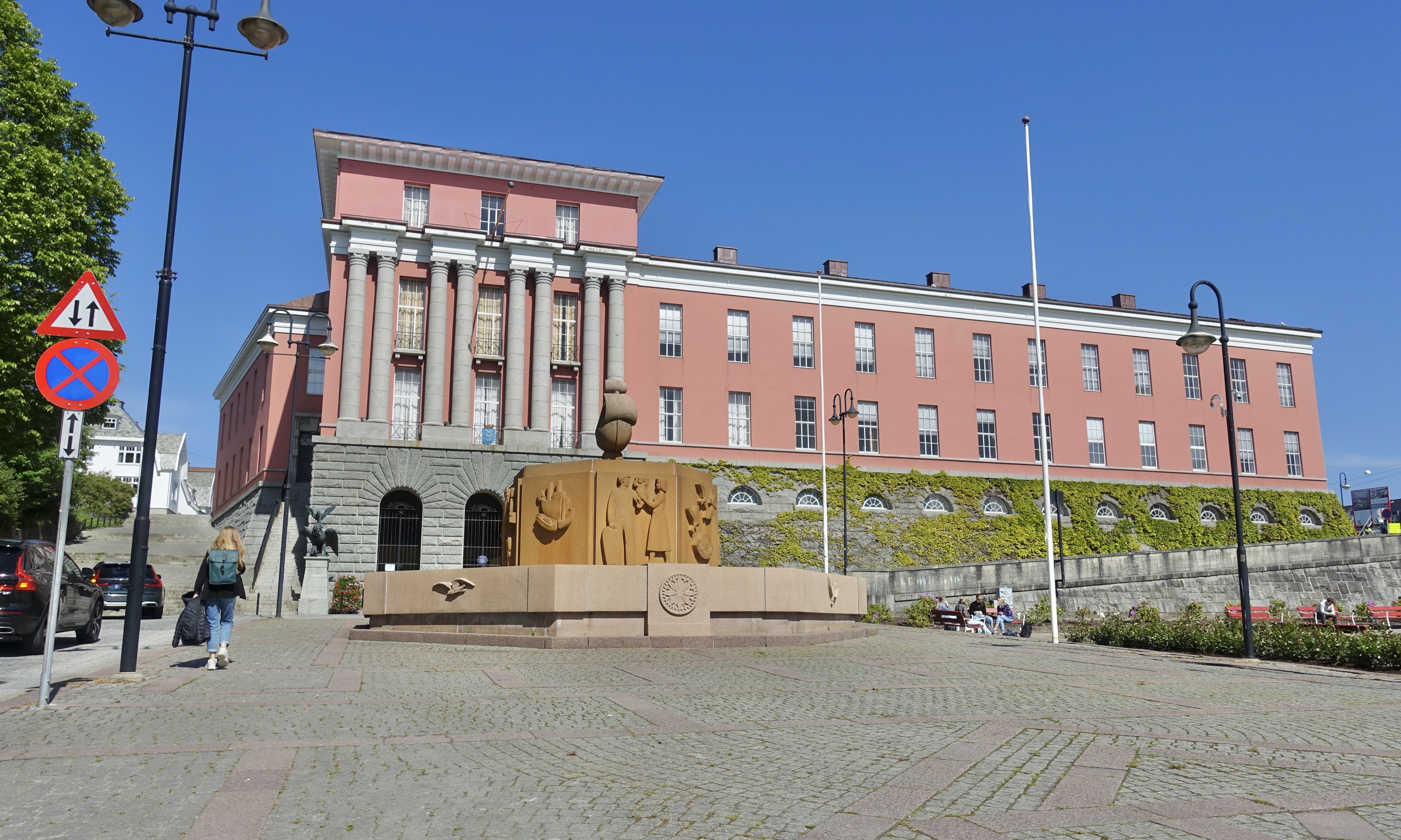
- The city hall, designed by Gudolf Blakstad and Herman Munthe-Kaas

- Flag Coat of arms

- Rogaland within Norway

- Haugesund within Rogaland
- Coordinates: 59°26′47″N 05°17′54″E
- Country: Norway
- County: Rogaland
- District: Haugaland
- Established: 1 Feb 1855
  - Preceded by: Torvastad Municipality
- Administrative centre: Haugesund

Government
  - Mayor (2023): Nils Konrad Bua (H)

Area
  - Total: 72.68 km^{2} (28.06 sq mi)
  - Land: 68.38 km^{2} (26.40 sq mi)
  - Water: 4.3 km^{2} (1.7 sq mi) 5.9%
  - Rank: #339 in Norway
- Highest elevation: 245.87 m (806.7 ft)

Population (2026)
  - Total: 38,663
  - Rank: #28 in Norway
  - Density: 532/km^{2} (1,380/sq mi)
  - Change (10 years): ▲ +4.6%
- Demonym(s): Haugesundar; Haugesunder

Official language
  - Norwegian form: Neutral
- Time zone: UTC+01:00 (CET)
  - Summer (DST): UTC+02:00 (CEST)
- ISO 3166 code: NO-1106
- Website: Official website

Haugesund ([ˈhæʉɡəsʉn]) is a municipality on the coast of the North Sea in Rogaland county, Norway. It is located in the traditional district of Haugaland. The administrative centre of the municipality is the town of Haugesund. Other village areas in Haugesund Municipality include Skokland, Vikse, Skastad, and Røvær. The majority of the municipality outside the town is rural or undeveloped.

The Haugesund Region, a statistical metropolitan area, which consists of Karmøy Municipality, Haugesund Municipality, Tysvær Municipality, Sveio Municipality, and Bokn Municipality, has a population of over 101,000 people (as of 2026). During the last 20 years, the municipality has established its position as the main trading centre for the Haugaland region and southern parts of Vestland county. It has several relatively large shopping centres, however, this has led to a decline of the trade and shopping activity in the town centre.

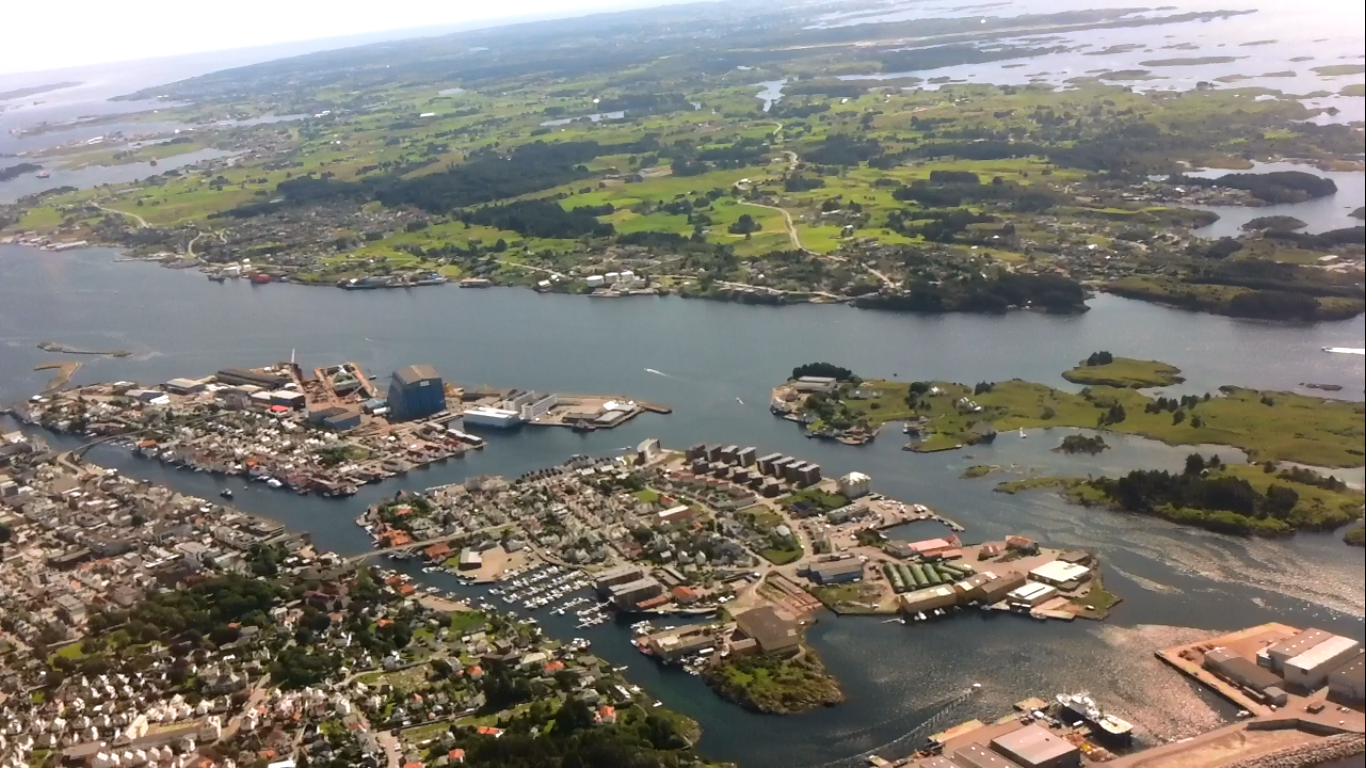
Hasseløya island in the Karmsundet strait which separates the rural island of Karmøy (top) and the urban Haugesund Municipality (below).

The 72.68-square-kilometre (28.06 sq mi) municipality is the 339th largest by area out of the 357 municipalities in Norway. Haugesund Municipality is the 28th most populous municipality in Norway with a population of 38,663. The municipality's population density is 532 inhabitants per square kilometre (1,380/sq mi) and its population has increased by 4.6% over the previous 10-year period.

The town of Haugesund dominates the landscape of the area. About 15.54 square kilometres (6.00 sq mi) of the municipality (about 21% of the municipality) is covered by the urban area of the town of Haugesund. The remaining area of the municipality (about 79% of the land area) is very rural. The portion of the municipality including the urban town of Haugesund has about 37,600 residents, while the rural portion of the municipality has about 1,000 residents. The town of Haugesund has grown to the south, so a portion of the urban town crosses over into Karmøy Municipality. The 5.88-square-kilometre (2.27 sq mi) area of the town located in Karmøy has about 9,700 residents.

== General information ==
In 1854, the urban village area of Haugesund (population: 1,066) was declared to be a ladested (lit. 'port of lading' or port town). Due to this designation, on 1 February 1855, the new town was separated from the large Torvastad Municipality to become a separate municipality. On 1 January 1911, a small urban area in the neighboring Skåre Municipality (population: 3,847) which directly abutted the town of Haugesund was transferred into Haugesund Municipality. On 1 January 1958, the remainder of the rural Skåre Municipality was merged with the town of Haugesund, creating a much larger Haugesund Municipality. On 1 January 1965, the island of Vibrandsøy (population: 70) was transferred from Torvastad Municipality into Haugesund Municipality.

=== Name ===
The municipality (and the town) is named after the Haugesundet strait (Old Norse: Haugasund), which is named after the old Hauge farm (Old Norse: Haugar). The first element is the plural genitive case of haugr which means "hill" or "mound". The last element is sund which means "strait" or "sound".

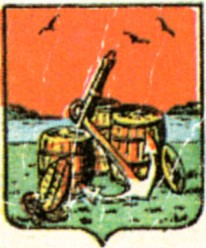
Arms from 1862–1930

Current arms

=== Coat of arms ===
The original coat of arms was granted on 29 December 1862 and it was in use until 5 March 1930 when a new coat of arms was approved. The arms were designed as a painting of a harbour scene. The old arms showed three full herring barrels sitting on land and an anchor leaning against the barrels. In the background, the ocean harbour is showing along with three seagulls flying in the sky. Often, it was shown with a gold mural crown above the shield. The old arms showed the importance of herring fishing and processing in the town. The three barrels also represented the three parts of the municipality: the mainland and the islands of Hasseløya and Risøya. The arms were designed by A. Fenger Krog.

A new coat of arms was granted on 5 March 1930 to replace the old arms and to simplify them for the celebration of the 75th anniversary of the town. The blazon is "Azure, three seagulls volant argent per fess surmounted by a mural crown Or" (Norwegian: I blått tre flyvnde sølv måker). This means the arms have a blue field (background) and the charge is a set of three seagulls lined up vertically. The charge has a tincture of argent which means it is commonly colored white, but if it is made out of metal, then silver is used. The seagulls and blue color were chosen to represent the importance of the sea. The new arms from 1930 removed the herring barrels from the old arms due to the decline in the importance of that industry. The arms were designed by Hallvard Trætteberg. The municipal flag has the same design as the coat of arms.

=== Churches ===
The Church of Norway has three parishes (sokn) within Haugesund Municipality. It is part of the Haugaland prosti (deanery) in the Diocese of Stavanger.

Churches in Haugesund Municipality
Parish (sokn)	Church name	Location of the church	Year built
Rossabø	Rossabø Church	Rossabø	1972
Skåre	Skåre Church	Haugesund	1858
Skåre	Udland Church	Haugesund	2002
Vår Frelser	Vår Frelsers Church	Haugesund	1901

== Geography ==
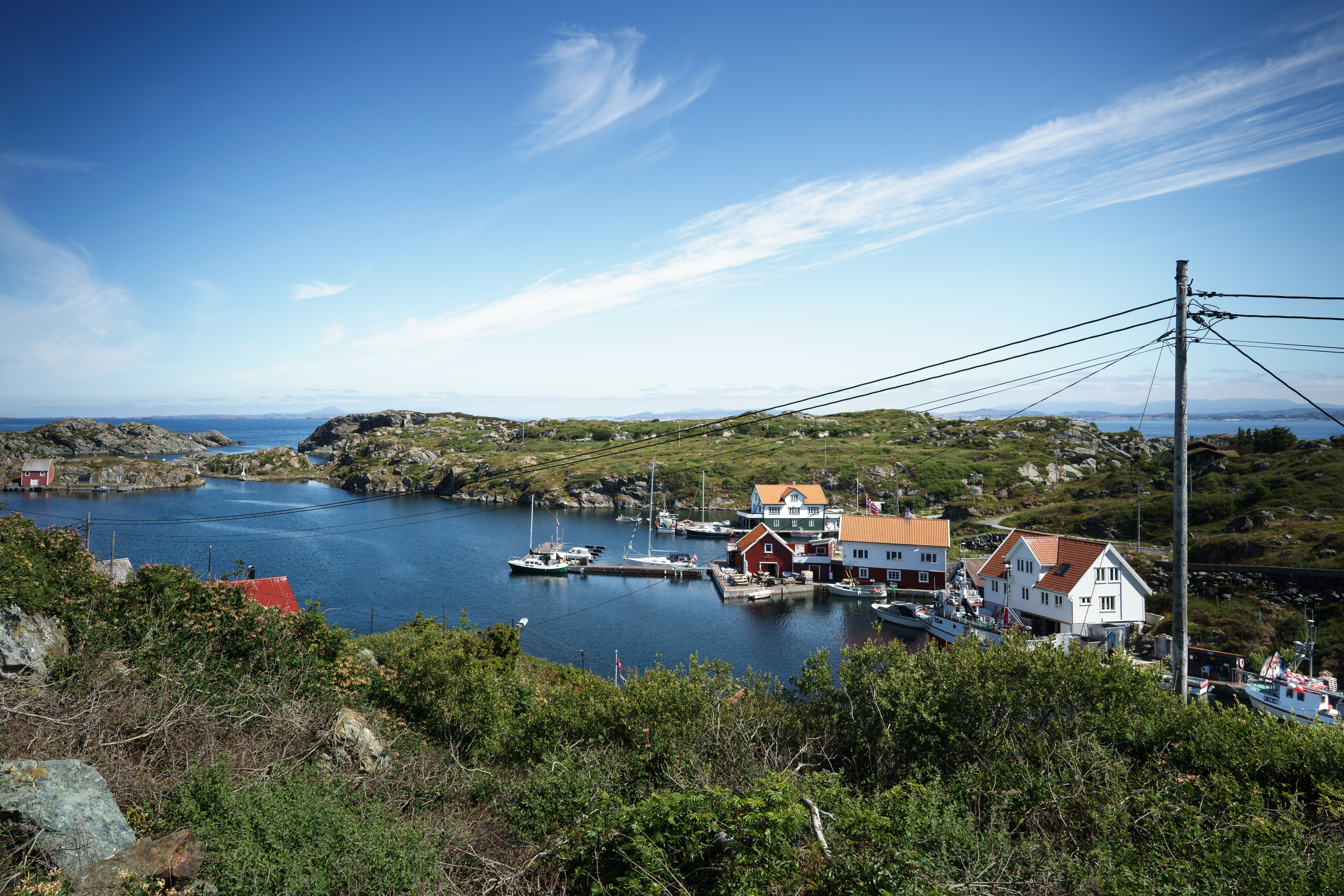
View of Røvær

Haugesund Municipality has a coastline with the North Sea, however, the island of Karmøy and the archipelago of Røvær shelter it from the rough waters of the ocean. The Karmsundetet strait, located between Karmøy island and the mainland of Haugesund Municipality used to be very strategically important, since ships could pass without having to sail through heavy sea. The islands of Risøya and Hasseløya lie in the Karmsundet and they are both densely built up. They are connected to the mainland by bridges. Røvær lies further out to sea and consists of a number of islands. Røvær is sparsely populated and connected to the mainland by ferry. The islands of Vibrandsøya and its neighboring islands are now mainly a recreational area. The Røværsholmen Lighthouse sits just off the coast of the main Røvær island. The lakes Vigdarvatnet and Stakkastadvatnet both are located in the municipality.

== Government ==
Haugesund Municipality is responsible for primary education (through 10th grade), outpatient health services, senior citizen services, welfare and other social services, zoning, economic development, and municipal roads and utilities. The municipality is governed by a municipal council of directly elected representatives. The mayor is indirectly elected by a vote of the municipal council. The municipality is under the jurisdiction of the Haugaland og Sunnhordland District Court and the Gulating Court of Appeal.

=== Municipal council ===
The municipal council (Kommunestyre) of Haugesund Municipality is made up of 49 representatives that are elected every four years. The government is located at the Haugesund City Hall. The tables below show the current and historical composition of the council by political party

Haugesund kommunestyre 2023–2027
Party name (in Norwegian)	Number of representatives
Labour Party (Arbeiderpartiet)	11
Progress Party (Fremskrittspartiet)	7
Green Party (Miljøpartiet De Grønne)	1
Conservative Party (Høyre)	15
Industry and Business Party (Industri‑ og Næringspartiet)	3
Christian Democratic Party (Kristelig Folkeparti)	2
Pensioners' Party (Pensjonistpartiet)	2
Red Party (Rødt)	1
Centre Party (Senterpartiet)	1
Socialist Left Party (Sosialistisk Venstreparti)	4
Liberal Party (Venstre)	2
Total number of members:	49

Haugesund kommunestyre 2019–2023
Party name (in Norwegian)	Number of representatives
Labour Party (Arbeiderpartiet)	15
Progress Party (Fremskrittspartiet)	6
Green Party (Miljøpartiet De Grønne)	3
Conservative Party (Høyre)	14
Christian Democratic Party (Kristelig Folkeparti)	2
Pensioners' Party (Pensjonistpartiet)	2
Red Party (Rødt)	1
Centre Party (Senterpartiet)	2
Socialist Left Party (Sosialistisk Venstreparti)	3
Liberal Party (Venstre)	1
Total number of members:	49

Haugesund kommunestyre 2015–2019
Party name (in Norwegian)	Number of representatives
Labour Party (Arbeiderpartiet)	19
Progress Party (Fremskrittspartiet)	7
Green Party (Miljøpartiet De Grønne)	2
Conservative Party (Høyre)	11
Christian Democratic Party (Kristelig Folkeparti)	3
Pensioners' Party (Pensjonistpartiet)	2
Centre Party (Senterpartiet)	1
Socialist Left Party (Sosialistisk Venstreparti)	2
Liberal Party (Venstre)	2
Total number of members:	49

Haugesund kommunestyre 2011–2015
Party name (in Norwegian)	Number of representatives
Labour Party (Arbeiderpartiet)	14
Progress Party (Fremskrittspartiet)	6
Conservative Party (Høyre)	19
Christian Democratic Party (Kristelig Folkeparti)	3
Pensioners' Party (Pensjonistpartiet)	3
Socialist Left Party (Sosialistisk Venstreparti)	1
Liberal Party (Venstre)	3
Total number of members:	49

Haugesund kommunestyre 2007–2011
Party name (in Norwegian)	Number of representatives
Labour Party (Arbeiderpartiet)	10
Progress Party (Fremskrittspartiet)	7
Conservative Party (Høyre)	20
Christian Democratic Party (Kristelig Folkeparti)	3
Pensioners' Party (Pensjonistpartiet)	2
Socialist Left Party (Sosialistisk Venstreparti)	2
Liberal Party (Venstre)	5
Total number of members:	49

Haugesund kommunestyre 2003–2007
Party name (in Norwegian)	Number of representatives
Labour Party (Arbeiderpartiet)	12
Progress Party (Fremskrittspartiet)	12
Conservative Party (Høyre)	14
Christian Democratic Party (Kristelig Folkeparti)	3
Pensioners' Party (Pensjonistpartiet)	1
Centre Party (Senterpartiet)	1
Socialist Left Party (Sosialistisk Venstreparti)	4
Liberal Party (Venstre)	2
Total number of members:	49

Haugesund kommunestyre 1999–2003
Party name (in Norwegian)	Number of representatives
Labour Party (Arbeiderpartiet)	12
Progress Party (Fremskrittspartiet)	10
Conservative Party (Høyre)	15
Christian Democratic Party (Kristelig Folkeparti)	6
Socialist Left Party (Sosialistisk Venstreparti)	3
Liberal Party (Venstre)	3
Total number of members:	49

Haugesund kommunestyre 1995–1999
Party name (in Norwegian)	Number of representatives
Labour Party (Arbeiderpartiet)	12
Progress Party (Fremskrittspartiet)	9
Conservative Party (Høyre)	11
Christian Democratic Party (Kristelig Folkeparti)	6
Pensioners' Party (Pensjonistpartiet)	2
Centre Party (Senterpartiet)	1
Socialist Left Party (Sosialistisk Venstreparti)	2
Liberal Party (Venstre)	6
Total number of members:	49

Haugesund kommunestyre 1991–1995
Party name (in Norwegian)	Number of representatives
Labour Party (Arbeiderpartiet)	15
Progress Party (Fremskrittspartiet)	7
Conservative Party (Høyre)	13
Christian Democratic Party (Kristelig Folkeparti)	11
Pensioners' Party (Pensjonistpartiet)	12
Centre Party (Senterpartiet)	2
Socialist Left Party (Sosialistisk Venstreparti)	5
Liberal Party (Venstre)	4
Total number of members:	69

Haugesund kommunestyre 1987–1991
Party name (in Norwegian)	Number of representatives
Labour Party (Arbeiderpartiet)	22
Progress Party (Fremskrittspartiet)	11
Conservative Party (Høyre)	18
Christian Democratic Party (Kristelig Folkeparti)	10
Socialist Left Party (Sosialistisk Venstreparti)	2
Liberal Party (Venstre)	6
Total number of members:	69

Haugesund kommunestyre 1983–1987
Party name (in Norwegian)	Number of representatives
Labour Party (Arbeiderpartiet)	25
Progress Party (Fremskrittspartiet)	7
Conservative Party (Høyre)	21
Christian Democratic Party (Kristelig Folkeparti)	10
Centre Party (Senterpartiet)	1
Socialist Left Party (Sosialistisk Venstreparti)	2
Liberal Party (Venstre)	3
Total number of members:	69

Haugesund kommunestyre 1979–1983
Party name (in Norwegian)	Number of representatives
Labour Party (Arbeiderpartiet)	22
Progress Party (Fremskrittspartiet)	4
Conservative Party (Høyre)	26
Christian Democratic Party (Kristelig Folkeparti)	11
New People's Party (Nye Folkepartiet)	1
Centre Party (Senterpartiet)	1
Socialist Left Party (Sosialistisk Venstreparti)	1
Liberal Party (Venstre)	3
Total number of members:	69

Haugesund kommunestyre 1975–1979
Party name (in Norwegian)	Number of representatives
Labour Party (Arbeiderpartiet)	25
Anders Lange's Party (Anders Langes parti)	4
Conservative Party (Høyre)	16
Christian Democratic Party (Kristelig Folkeparti)	12
New People's Party (Nye Folkepartiet)	6
Centre Party (Senterpartiet)	2
Socialist Left Party (Sosialistisk Venstreparti)	2
Liberal Party (Venstre)	2
Total number of members:	69

Haugesund kommunestyre 1971–1975
Party name (in Norwegian)	Number of representatives
Labour Party (Arbeiderpartiet)	25
Conservative Party (Høyre)	16
Christian Democratic Party (Kristelig Folkeparti)	10
Centre Party (Senterpartiet)	3
Socialist People's Party (Sosialistisk Folkeparti)	2
Liberal Party (Venstre)	13
Total number of members:	69

Haugesund kommunestyre 1967–1971
Party name (in Norwegian)	Number of representatives
Labour Party (Arbeiderpartiet)	26
Conservative Party (Høyre)	17
Christian Democratic Party (Kristelig Folkeparti)	8
Centre Party (Senterpartiet)	1
Socialist People's Party (Sosialistisk Folkeparti)	2
Liberal Party (Venstre)	15
Total number of members:	69

Haugesund kommunestyre 1963–1967
Party name (in Norwegian)	Number of representatives
Labour Party (Arbeiderpartiet)	29
Conservative Party (Høyre)	18
Christian Democratic Party (Kristelig Folkeparti)	7
Centre Party (Senterpartiet)	1
Liberal Party (Venstre)	14
Total number of members:	69

Haugesund kommunestyre 1959–1963
Party name (in Norwegian)	Number of representatives
Labour Party (Arbeiderpartiet)	26
Conservative Party (Høyre)	17
Christian Democratic Party (Kristelig Folkeparti)	7
Centre Party (Senterpartiet)	1
Liberal Party (Venstre)	18
Total number of members:	69

Haugesund bystyre 1955–1959
Party name (in Norwegian)	Number of representatives
Labour Party (Arbeiderpartiet)	24
Conservative Party (Høyre)	16
Christian Democratic Party (Kristelig Folkeparti)	7
Liberal Party (Venstre)	14
Total number of members:	61

Haugesund bystyre 1951–1955
Party name (in Norwegian)	Number of representatives
Labour Party (Arbeiderpartiet)	22
Conservative Party (Høyre)	14
Communist Party (Kommunistiske Parti)	1
Christian Democratic Party (Kristelig Folkeparti)	7
Liberal Party (Venstre)	16
Total number of members:	60

Haugesund bystyre 1947–1951
Party name (in Norwegian)	Number of representatives
Labour Party (Arbeiderpartiet)	21
Conservative Party (Høyre)	14
Communist Party (Kommunistiske Parti)	2
Christian Democratic Party (Kristelig Folkeparti)	5
Liberal Party (Venstre)	18
Total number of members:	60

Haugesund bystyre 1945–1947
Party name (in Norwegian)	Number of representatives
Labour Party (Arbeiderpartiet)	25
Conservative Party (Høyre)	13
Communist Party (Kommunistiske Parti)	4
Liberal Party (Venstre)	18
Total number of members:	60

Haugesund bystyre 1937–1941*
Party name (in Norwegian)	Number of representatives
Labour Party (Arbeiderpartiet)	21
Conservative Party (Høyre)	21
Liberal Party (Venstre)	18
Total number of members:	60
Note: Due to the German occupation of Norway during World War II, no elections were held for new municipal councils until after the war ended in 1945.

=== Mayors ===
The mayor (Bokmål: ordfører) of Haugesund Municipality is the political leader of the municipality and the chairperson of the municipal council. The following people have held this position:

- 1855–1856: Tønnes Eide
- 1857–1858: Gudmund Halleland
- 1859–1860: Peder A. Høydahl
- 1861–1866: Ludolf J. Eide
- 1867–1867: Østen Kolstø
- 1868–1868: Ditlev Møller
- 1869–1871: E. M. Fredriksen
- 1872–1872: Jens H. Hansen
- 1873–1874: Ludolf J. Eide
- 1875–1876: Arne Lothe
- 1877–1877: Ludolf J. Eide
- 1878–1878: Jens H. Hansen
- 1879–1879: Hans J. Steensnæs
- 1880–1880: Arne Lothe
- 1881–1881: Ludolf J. Eide
- 1882–1882: Jens H. Hansen
- 1883–1883: Hans J. Steensnæs (V)
- 1884–1884: Jens H. Hansen (V)
- 1885–1885: Hans J. Steensnæs (MV)
- 1886–1886: Hans J. Kyvik
- 1887–1887: J. Ferdinand Jacobsen
- 1888–1888: Jacob Kielland
- 1889–1889: Frithjof Eide (V)
- 1890–1890: Hans J. Steensnæs (MV)
- 1891–1891: Svend Jacobsen (MV)
- 1892–1892: Johan Aubert
- 1893–1893: Svend Jacobsen (MV)
- 1894–1895: Hakon Magne Wrangell (MV)
- 1896–1896: Hans Steen (MV/H)
- 1897–1897: Hakon Magne Wrangell (MV)
- 1898–1898: Hans Steen (MV/H)
- 1899–1899:Hakon Magne Wrangell (MV)
- 1900–1900: Thomas Haaland (MV)
- 1901–1901: Erich Lindøe (MV)
- 1902–1903: Thomas Haaland (MV)
- 1904–1904: Rasmus G. Hagland (V)
- 1905–1907: Ola Bertelsen (V)
- 1908–1908: Svend Lindøe (AvH)
- 1909–1909: Valentin Valentinsen (V)
- 1910–1910: Thomas Haaland (LL)
- 1911–1911: Magne Rønnevig (V)
- 1912–1912: Carl J. Dueland (Ap)
- 1913–1913: Bernt Seland (V)
- 1914–1914: Svend Lindøe (AvH)
- 1915–1916: Valentin Valentinsen (V)
- 1917–1917: Lars O. Meling (V)
- 1918–1918: Kristian Holgersen (V)
- 1919–1919: Carl J. Westerlund (Ap)
- 1920–1921: Peder Haugen (FV)
- 1922–1922: Carl J. Westerlund (Ap)
- 1923–1924: Gabriel Faye (FV)
- 1925–1925: Christian Haaland (H)
- 1926–1926: Clement Gerhardsen (FV)
- 1927–1927: Edvard Velde (NSA)
- 1928–1931: Christian Haaland (H)
- 1932–1935: H. Karluf Hanssen (V)
- 1936–1936: Søren Caspersen (Ap)
- 1937–1937: Martin Olaussen (Ap)
- 1938–1938: Ingvald Førre (Ap)
- 1939–1940: Sigurd Lie (H)
- 1941–1941: Eystein Jenssen (LL)
- 1942–1945: Jacob Kyvik (NS)
- 1945–1945: Hans Jacobsen (NS)
- 1945–1945: Sigurd Lie (H)
- 1946–1947: Nils E. Nilsen (Ap)
- 1948–1949: Einar Osland (V)
- 1950–1950: Karl Sørensen (V)
- 1951–1951: Andreas Gullhaugen (Ap)
- 1952–1952: Karl Sørensen (V)
- 1953–1953: Rasmus Bakkevig (H)
- 1954–1954: Karl Sørensen (V)
- 1955–1955: Gunnar Fredrik Hellesen (H)
- 1956–1957: Karl Sørensen (V)
- 1958–1959: Gunnar Fredrik Hellesen (H)
- 1960–1961: Karl Sørensen (V)
- 1962–1963: Stener Askeland (H)
- 1964–1965: Jens Edvard Haugland (V)
- 1966–1967: Stener Askeland (H)
- 1968–1969: Jens Edvard Haugland (V)
- 1970–1971: Olle Johan Eriksen (H)
- 1972–1973: Jens Edvard Haugland (V)
- 1974–1975: Olle Johan Eriksen (H)
- 1976–1977: Ola Foldøy (KrF)
- 1978–1983: Olle Johan Eriksen (H)
- 1984–1987: Edvard Ringen, Jr. (H)
- 1988–1989: Einar Steensnæs (KrF)
- 1990–1991: Nils J. Storesund (Ap)
- 1992–1993: Einar Steensnæs (KrF)
- 1993–1995: Turid Dalland (H)
- 1995–2001: Finn Martin Vallersnes (H)
- 2001–2015: Petter Steen Jr. (H)
- 2015–2023: Arne-Christian Mohn (Ap)
- 2023–present: Nils Konrad Bua (H)

== Education ==
The main campus of Stord/Haugesund University College is located in the town of Haugesund. Established in 1994, it is the result of the merger between Haugesund Nursing College, Stord Teachers College, and Stord Nursing College. The university college has approximately 2700 students and 260 employees, thus making it one of the smallest university colleges in Norway.

Rogaland county operates four high schools in Haugesund Municipality. The schools Skeisvang and Vardafjell prepare pupils for further for college or university studies. The schools Haugaland and Karmsund are vocational high schools. In addition, the private Haugesund Toppidrettsgymnas has a sports-oriented high school program.

Haugesund Municipality has seven pure elementary schools of grades 1 to 7 (Saltveit, Gard, Austrheim, Solvang, Lillesund, Rossabø, and Brakahaug), two pure middle schools of grades 8 to 10 (Haraldsvang and Håvåsen), and three grade 1 to 10 schools (Hauge, Røvær, and Skåredalen). In addition, the Breidablik school offers elementary and middle school courses to new foreigners and refugees. The two private schools are Steinerskolen offering a Waldorf education program, and Danielsen, a Christian school offering courses for grades 8 and 9.

== International relations ==
=== Twin towns – sister cities ===
Haugesund has sister city agreements with the following places:

- Ekenäs, Uusimaa, Finland
- Emden, Lower Saxony, Germany
- Søllerød, Hovedstaden, Denmark
- Ystad, Skåne, Sweden

Each of the sister cities (with exception of Emden) has given its name to a street in Haugesund. The streets are located in the same area near the border to the neighbouring municipality.
