= Haugesund City Hall =

- Haugesund rådhus
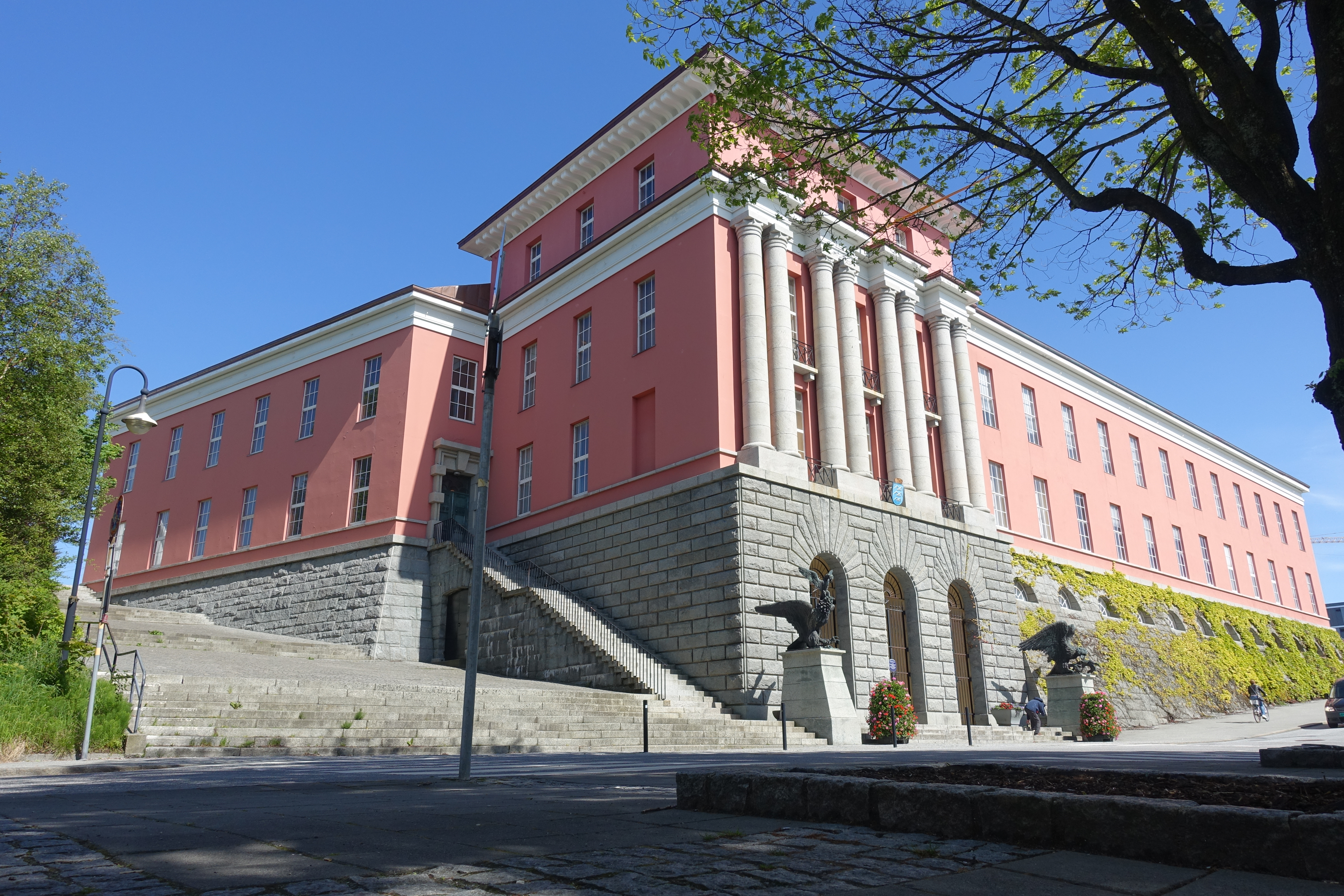
- The City Hall
- Interactive map of the Haugesund City Hall area

General information
- Location: Haugesund, Norway
- Coordinates: 59°24′36.86″N 5°16′32.45″E
- Current tenants: Haugesund City Council
- Construction started: 1923
- Completed: 1931
- Owner: Haugesund Municipality

Technical details
- Floor area: 3,000 square metres (32,000 sq ft)

Design and construction
- Architects: Herman Munthe-Kaas; Gudolf Blakstad

References
- Haugesund Rådhus. Haugesund municipality by Idar H. Pedersen (in Norwegian)

Haugesund City Hall is the city hall of Haugesund Municipality in Rogaland county, Norway.

== History ==
Funding for the city hall was donated in 1921 by shipping magnate Knut Knutsen (Knut Knutsen OAS) and his wife Elisabeth. In 1921 they donated 1 million Norwegian krones to the construction of the town hall. The gift was given in respect Knut Knutsen O.A.S. 50 years anniversary. Later, the shipping magnate also provided funding for the preparation of the park around the town hall. In 1947 Elisabeth Knutsen donated 1 million krones for preparation of the city hall's square and the decorations of the city hall and the garden of the city hall.

It was completed a closed architectural competition and the architects Herman Munthe-Kaas and Gudolf Blakstad was commissioned to draw the city hall. The draft distinguishes itself by being drawn in a style of the 1920s, the internationally oriented Neoclassism.

Construction work began in 1923 and the city hall was completed in autumn 1931. Because of serious financial problems due to the growing international economic crisis, the construction work set in 1925 until spring 1929. As construction work got under way again, the plans were simplified and altered a more functionalistic direction.

The building's distinctive bright red (pink) exterior color has remained unchanged from it was completed. From 1993, the city hall and the city hall gardens were protected by law.

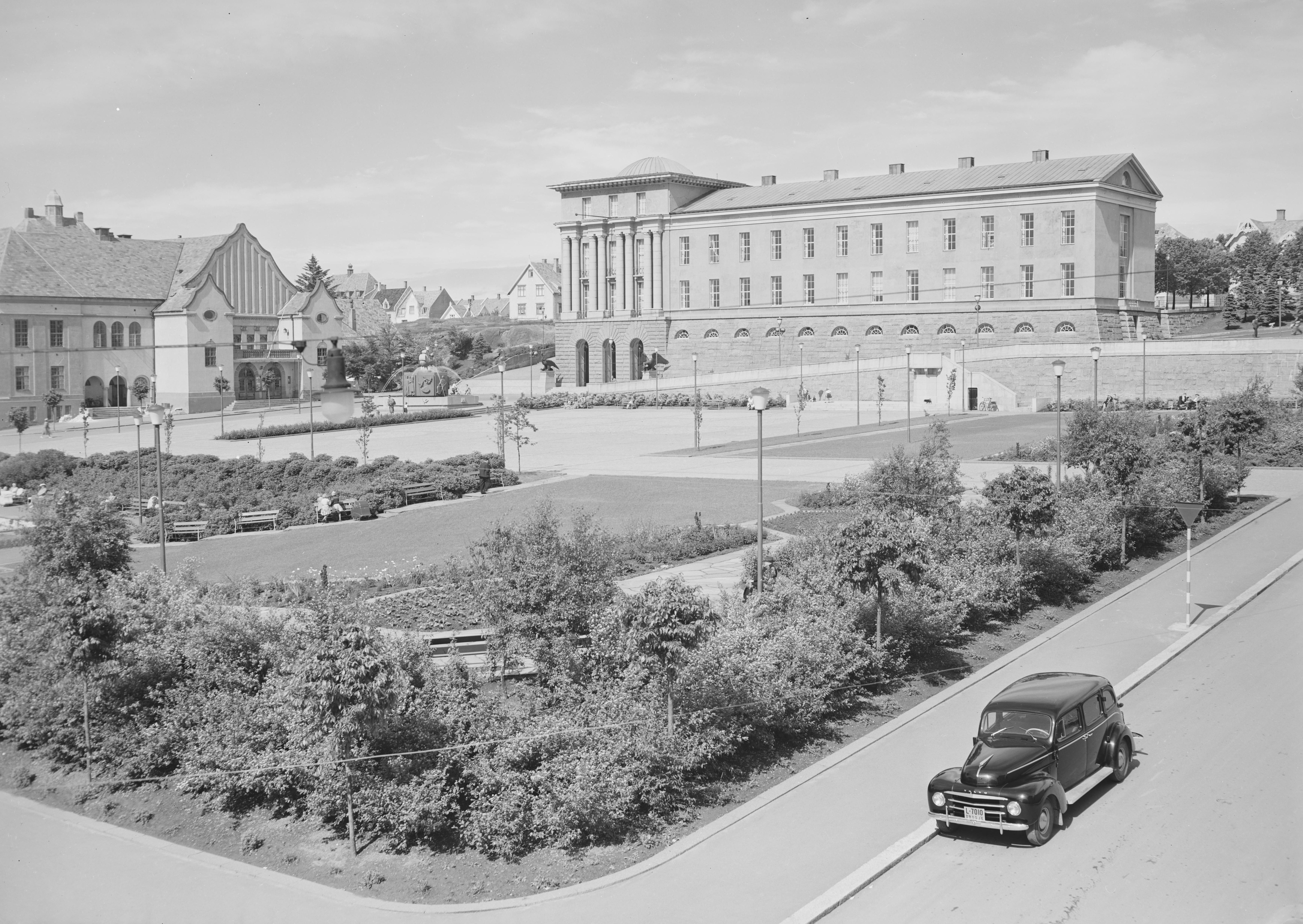
Haugesund City Hall and the square before 1951 (National Library of Norway)

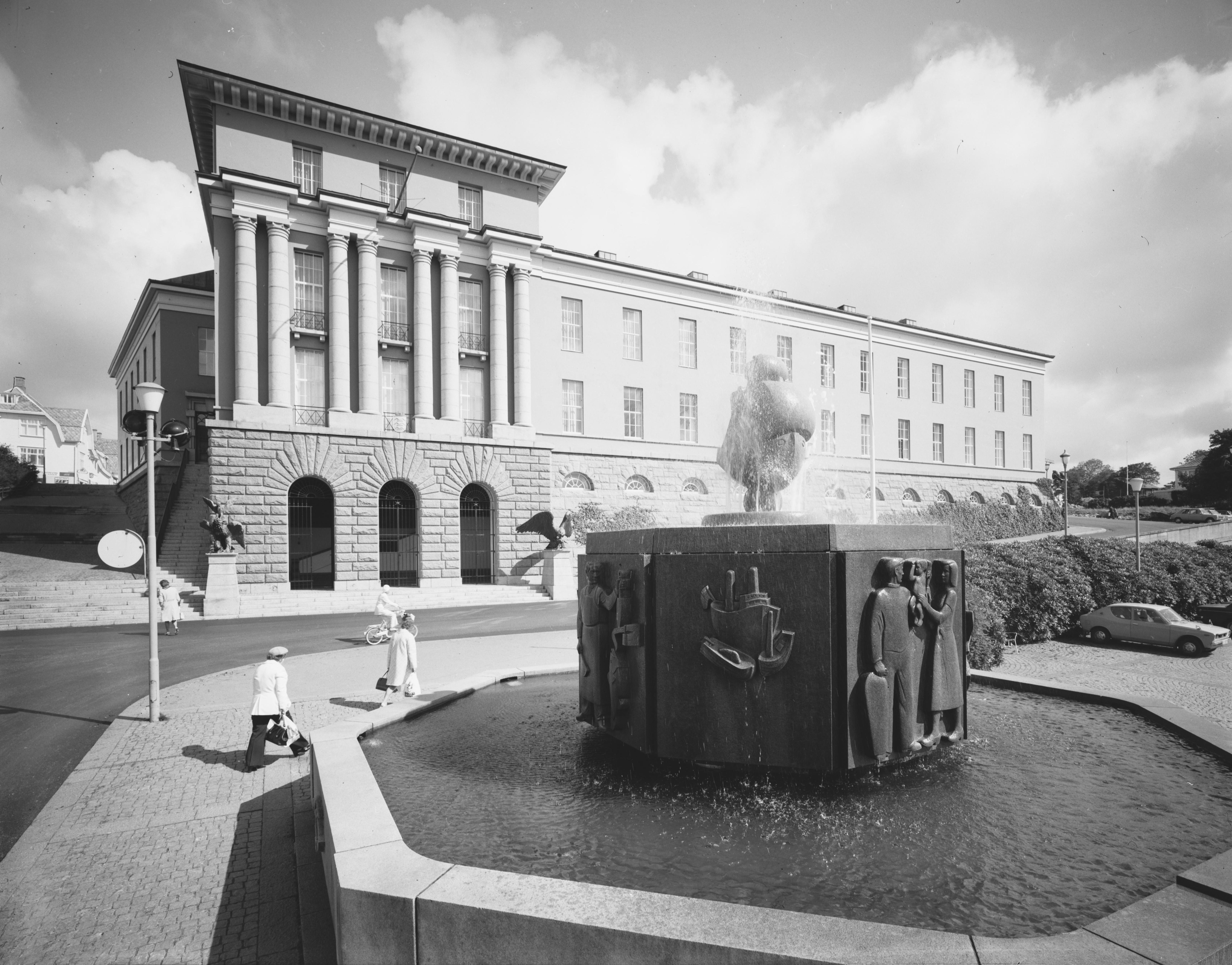
City hall with the fountain "By og hav" (City and sea) by Nils Erik Flakstad at the City Hall Square in 1973 (National Library of Norway)
