= Syrstad =

Syrstad may refer to:

- Syrstad Rock, a rock outcrop on Mount Bursey, Marie Byrd Land, West Antarctica

== People with the surname ==
- Johan Syrstad (born 1924), Norwegian politician
- Kåre Syrstad (1939–2013), Norwegian agrarian leader

== See also ==
- John Systad (1912–1998), Norwegian long-distance runner
