= Nils Erik Flakstad =

Nils Erik Flakstad may refer to:

- Nils Erik Flakstad (politician)
- Nils Erik Flakstad (sculptor)
