= Nordic Classicism =

Architectural style

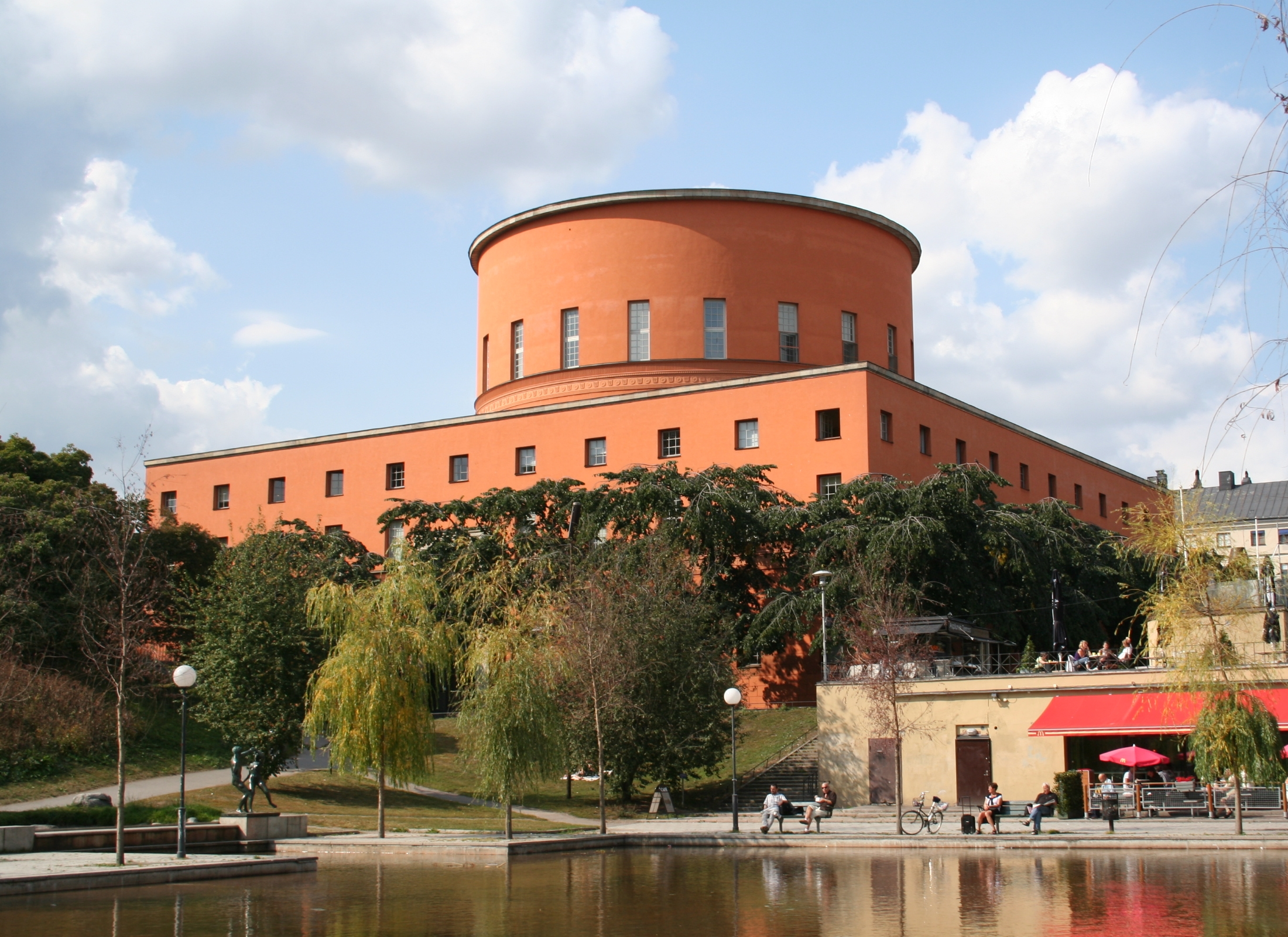
Stockholm Public Library (1920–28) by Gunnar Asplund.

Nordic Classicism was a style of architecture that briefly blossomed in the Nordic countries (Sweden, Denmark, Norway and Finland) between 1910 and 1930. The style was also known as Swedish Grace architecture in Sweden.

Until a resurgence of interest in the period during the 1980s (marked by several scholarly studies and public exhibitions), Nordic Classicism was regarded as a mere interlude between two much better-known architectural movements, National Romanticism, or Jugendstil (often seen as equivalent or parallel to Art Nouveau), and Functionalism (a.k.a. Modernism).

== History ==
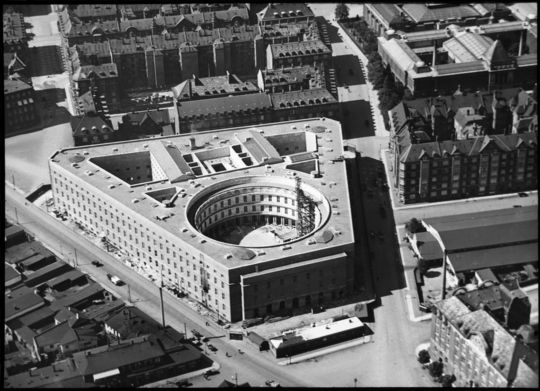
Copenhagen Police Headquarters (1924) by Hack Kampmann.

The development of Nordic Classicism was no isolated phenomenon, but took off from classical traditions already existing in the Nordic countries, and from new ideas being pursued in German-speaking cultures. Nordic Classicism can thus be characterised as a combination of direct and indirect influences from vernacular architecture (Nordic, Italian and German) and Neoclassicism, but also the early stirrings of Modernism from the Deutscher Werkbund – especially their exhibition of 1914 – and by the mid-1920s the Esprit Nouveau emerging from the theories of Le Corbusier.

The modernist influence went beyond mere aesthetics: urbanisation tied to modern building techniques and the introduction of regulations both in building and town planning, and moreover, to the rise of social forces that resulted in a change in political ideology toward the Left, resulting in the Nordic welfare state, and new programmes for public buildings such as hospitals (e.g. the Beckomberga Hospital in western Stockholm (1927–1935) by Carl Westman) and schools (e.g. the Fridhemsplan school, Stockholm, (1925–27) by Georg A. Nilsson). But while Nordic Classicism was employed for a number of important public buildings, it was also applied as a model for low-cost housing (e.g. the Puu-Käpylä Garden Town, Helsinki (1920–25) by Martti Välikangas) and domestic architecture in general (e.g. an affordable sense of style for the nouveau riche).

The year 1930 is usually considered the end point of Nordic Classicism because that was the year of the Stockholm Exhibition, designed mostly by Gunnar Asplund and Sigurd Lewerentz, when a more purist Modernism was unveiled as a model for a modern society. However, key buildings continued to be built in the classical style after that, notably Östberg's Maritime Museum in Stockholm (1931–34).

== Notable architects ==
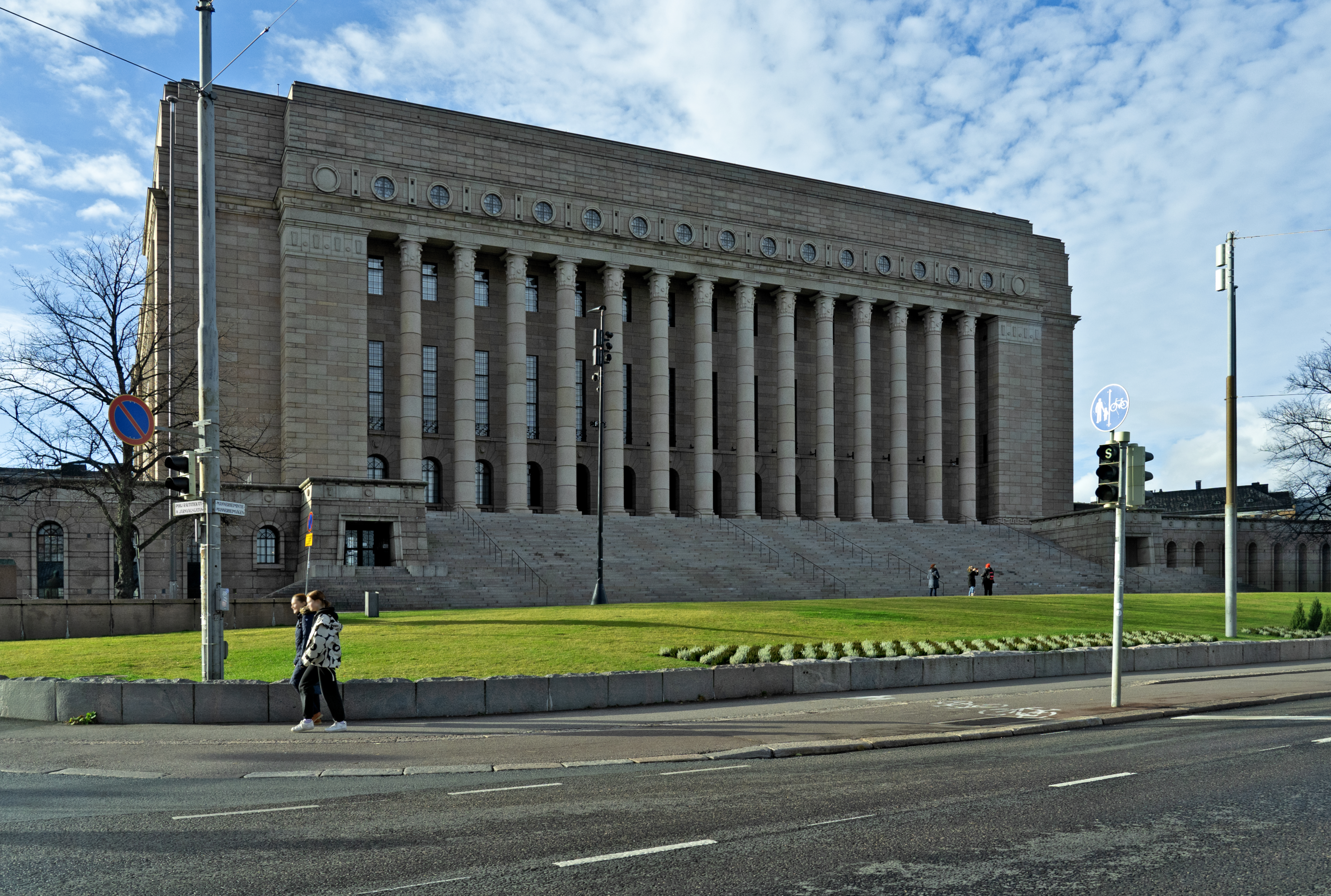
Parliament of Finland, Helsinki (1926–1931) by Johan Sigfrid Sirén.

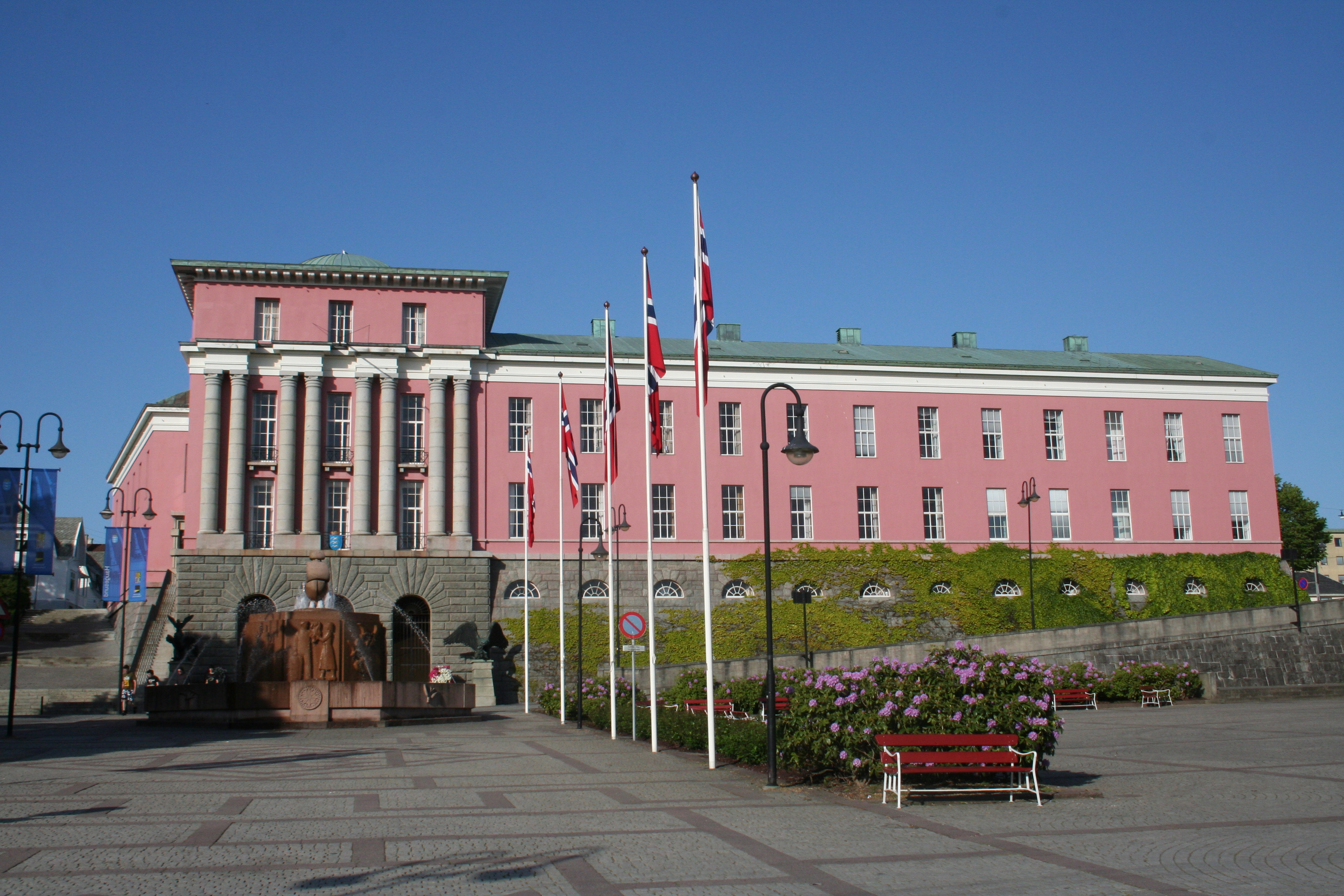
Haugesund City Hall (1922–1931) by Gudolf Blakstad and Herman Munthe-Kaas.

Certain architects had reached the culmination of their careers already when the National Romantic style came, but their later works were in the Nordic Classicism style (e.g. Carl Westman), the career of others culminated with Nordic Classicism (e.g. Ivar Tengbom and Ragnar Östberg), while others later went on to achieve far greater significance as Modernist architects (e.g. Arne Jacobsen, Alvar Aalto, and Sven Markelius). The two figures who achieved greatest significance in both periods, however, were Swedish architects Gunnar Asplund and Sigurd Lewerentz.

Denmark: Kay Fisker, Hack Kampmann, Kaj Gottlob, Ivar Bentsen, Povl Baumann, Poul Holsøe, Edvard Thomsen, Thomas Havning, Holger Jacobsen, Kaare Klint, Arne Jacobsen, Carl Petersen, Aage Rafn, Steen Eiler Rasmussen, Sven Risom, and Frits Schlegel.

Finland: Gunnar Taucher, Uno Ullberg, Martti Välikangas, J.S. Sirén, Alvar Aalto, Pauli E. Blomstedt, Elsi Borg, Erik Bryggman, Hilding Ekelund, Frans Jousi, Heikki Siikonen, and Oiva Kallio.

Norway: Lars Backer, Lorentz Ree, Sverre Pedersen, Nicolai Beer, Finn Berner, Harald Hals, Herman Munthe-Kaas, Gudolf Blakstad, Finn Bryn, Jens Dunker and Johan Ellefsen.

Sweden: Ragnar Östberg, Gunnar Asplund, Carl Westman, Sigurd Lewerentz, Carl Bergsten, Sigfrid Ericson, Torben Grut, Ragnar Hjorth, Cyrillus Johansson, Erik Lallerstedt, Gunnar Leche, Sven Markelius, Gunnar Morssing, George Nilsson, Ture Ryberg, Albin Stark, Eskil Sundahl, Lars Israel Wahlman, Sven Wallander, Hakon Ahlberg and Ivar Tengbom.

Though these architects are listed by country, during this period there was an intense cultural exchange among the Nordic countries (many architects worked in more than one), but also considerable development in the architect's sphere of activity, from consultant to the bourgeoisie to town planner concerned with infrastructure, dwelling and public services. As Swedish historian Henrik O. Anderson has put it, this was an architecture of democracy, not radical avant-gardism. Furthermore, with the exception of Finland, the other Nordic countries had avoided getting involved in the First World War, allowing for continued cultural development.

== Relationship to other movements ==
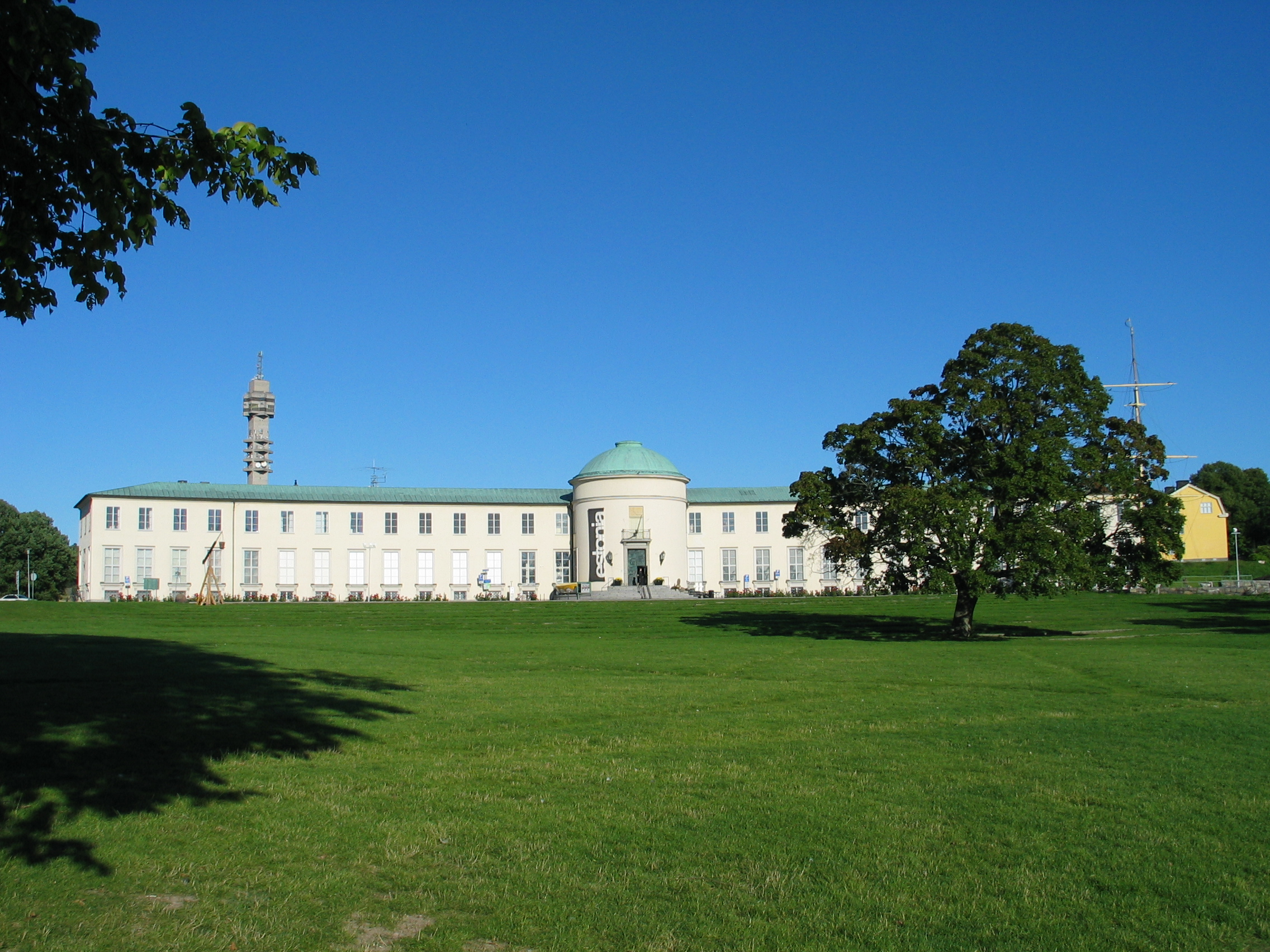
The Stockholm Maritime Museum (1931–1934) by Ragnar Östberg.

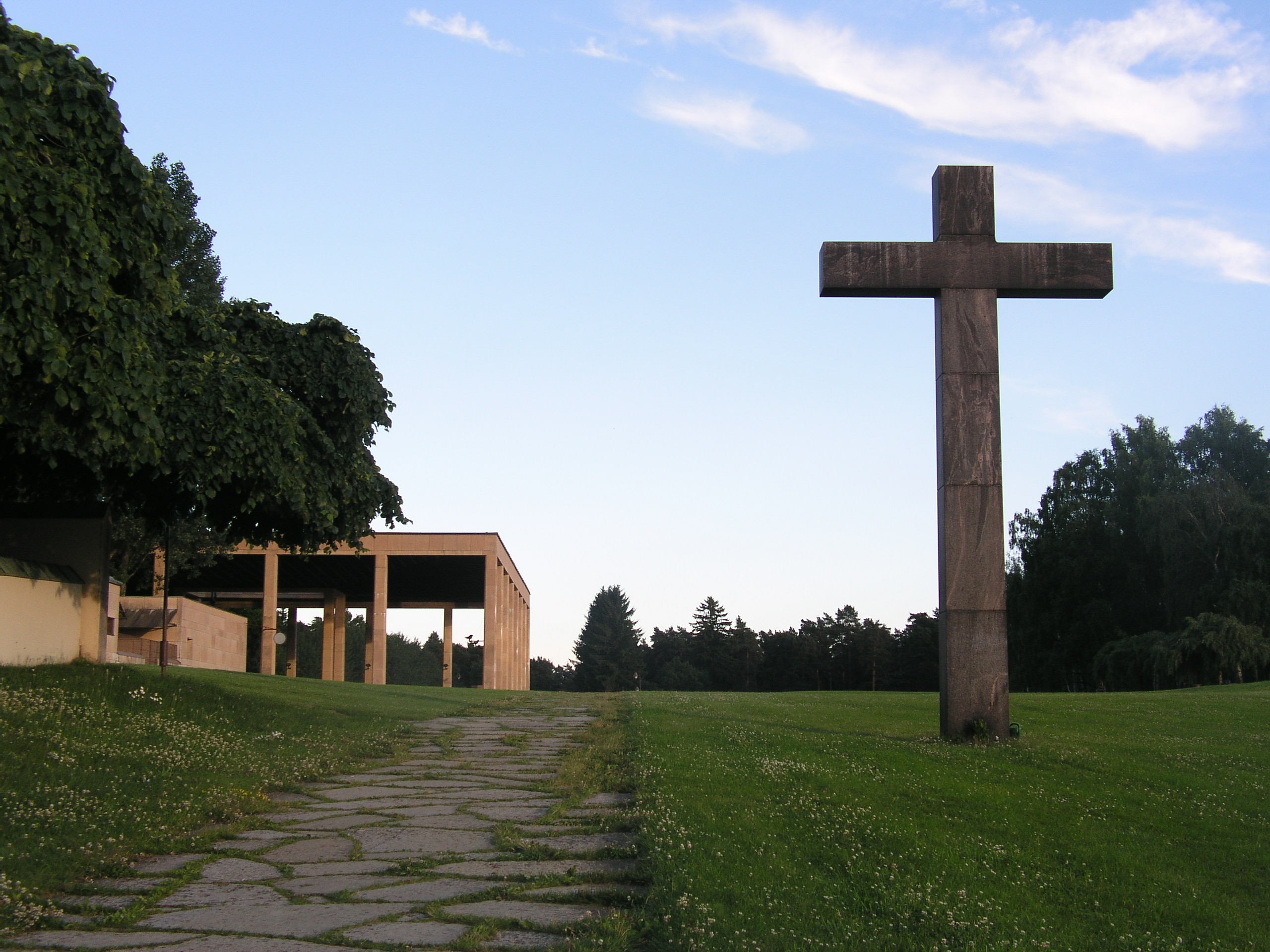
Skogskyrkogården, cemetery (1917–1940) by Gunnar Asplund and Sigurd Lewerentz.

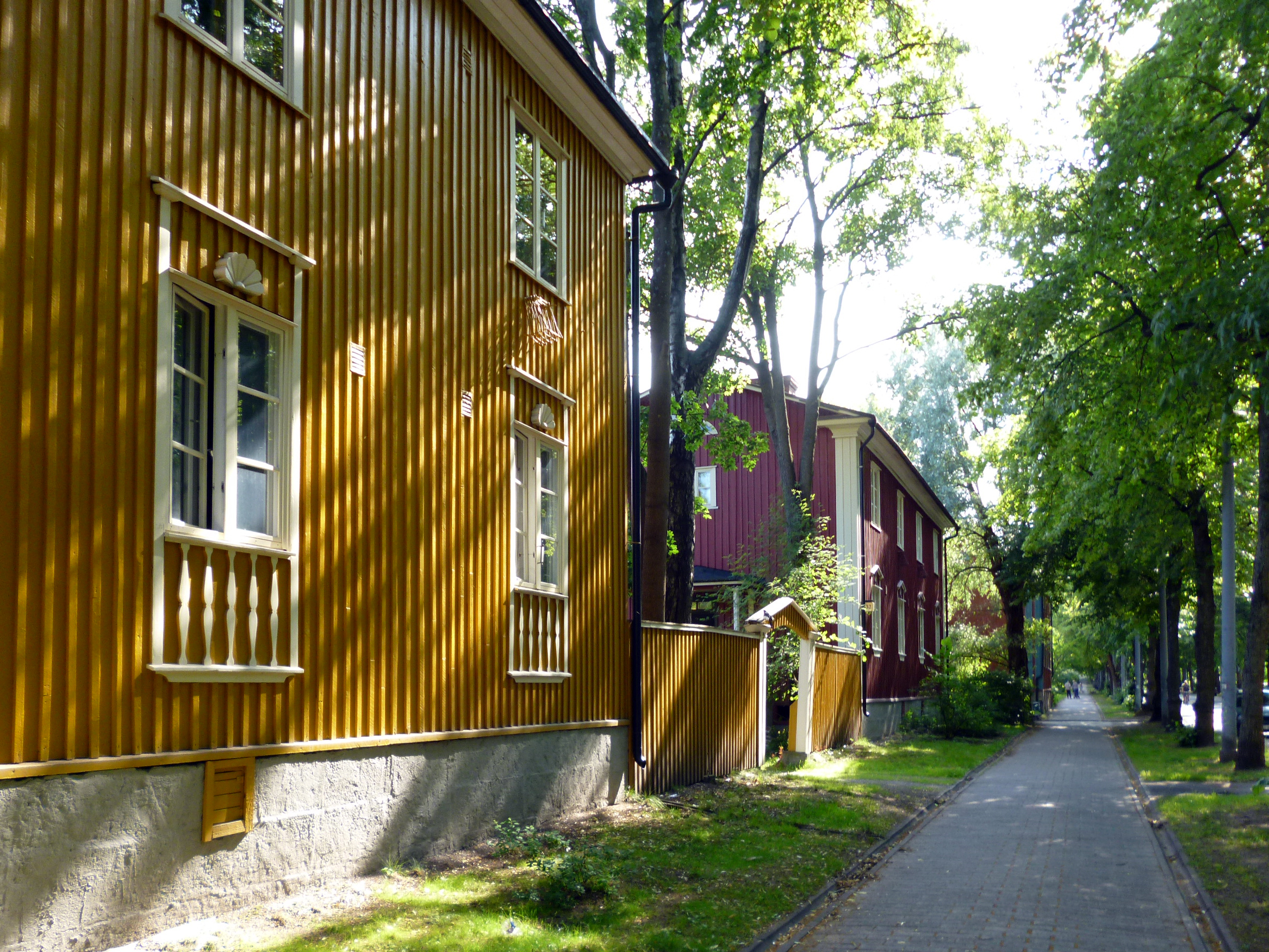
Puu-Käpylä workers' housing area, Helsinki (1920–25) by Martti Välikangas.

Interest in Nordic Classicism, especially in its most classical form, arose in the late 1970s and early 1980s at the height of postmodernism when critics, historians and architecture teachers were looking for historical precedents for the architecture of such architects as Michael Graves, Leon Krier and Robert Stern. Nordic classicism provided that precedent, especially with such seminal buildings as Gunnar Asplund's Scandia Cinema in Stockholm (1924), Listers District Courthouse (1917–21), Villa Snellman in Djursholm (1917–18) and Stockholm Public Library (1920–28), as well as the landscape and buildings of the Skogskyrkogården Cemetery, Stockholm (1917–1940) by both Asplund and Sigurd Lewerentz.

With regard to architectural style, there were several precedents or reasons which account for the rise of Nordic Classicism. First was the existing classical tradition, borne from the architecture of Absolutism – that is, the classical architectural symbols of power of the Swedish and Danish monarchies – down to the vernacular, for instance in terms of considerations for symmetry, detailing and proportion.

Throughout the 19th century there were a number of factors contributing to a more simplified classicism. The teachings of J.N.L. Durand at the École Polytechnique of Paris at the beginning of the 19th century had attempted to rationalise the language and building techniques of classicism, while allowing for simple additive compositions. Durand's teachings spread, entering German culture in the form of Romantic Classicism with the work of Friedrich Gilly and Karl Friedrich Schinkel. Scholars were at the time uncovering the remnants of Pompeii, and discovering the use of bright colour in Roman architecture – an aspect that had more or less been forgotten in the Renaissance, but also rediscovering Greece and Egypt. These aspects were incorporated into Neoclassicism and continued into Nordic Classicism (e.g. The Thorvaldsen Museum, Copenhagen, 1839–48, by M.G. Bindesbøll, incorporates Egyptian motifs as does Asplund's Stockholm Public Library).

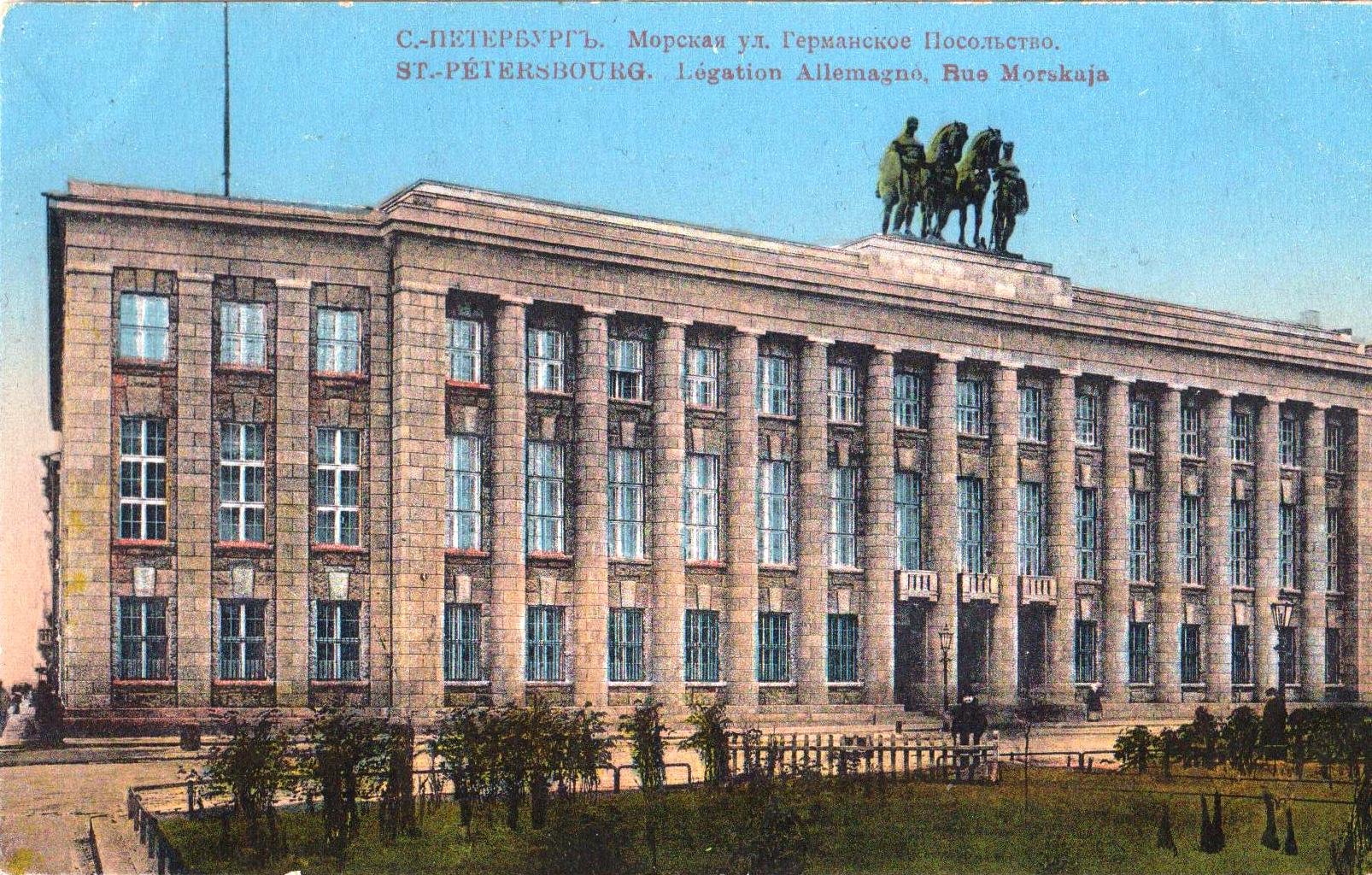
The building of the German embassy in St. Petersburg., built in 1913. Considered the earliest example of Stripped Classicism

There are also 'circles of reaction' to consider. Art Nouveau and National Romanticism had little impact in Denmark, while in Sweden, Norway and Finland there were also strong National Romantic reactions. Neoclassicism had arrived in Finland via Saint Petersburg as a universal language but by the end of the 19th century came to represent an alien presence – that of Russia. Also in Saint Petersburg a style originated which was later called Stripped Classicism. Thus, when stirrings of political independence appeared in Finland and Norway, a rugged, national romantic architecture – a local variation of Art Nouveau – playing on the nationalistic myths, took hold. Nordic classicism was thus a counter-reaction to that style and eclecticism in general; a movement toward universalism, internationalism and simplification.

Many of the architects who practiced in the Nordic Classical style made pilgrimages to northern Italy to study Italian vernacular architecture. With close cultural links at that time between the Nordic countries and Germany, another important source came from German critics of Art Nouveau, in particular Hermann Muthesius – who had been a promoter of the English Arts and Crafts movement and founded the Deutscher Werkbund in 1907 – and Paul Schultze-Naumburg, as well as the latter's student Heinrich Tessenow, and Peter Behrens.

In turn, the thinking in Nordic Classicism became one of the basis for the development of Modernism in the Nordic Countries. The idea that there would have been a continuity between vernacular and modernism has been seen as counter to received historical opinion about the rise of Modernism, beginning with Le Corbusier and his 5 Points for Architecture, which are seen as overturning 5 basic principles of Classicism. A demonstration in real time of the move from Nordic Classicism to a pure Functionalism is offered by Alvar Aalto's design for the Viipuri Library (1927–35), which went through a profound transformation from the original architectural competition proposal in 1927 (owing much to Gunnar Asplund) to the severely functionalist building, completed eight years later in a purist modernist style, influenced by Le Corbusier.
