= Oslo Commerce School =

Oslo Commerce School Oslo Handelsgymnasium
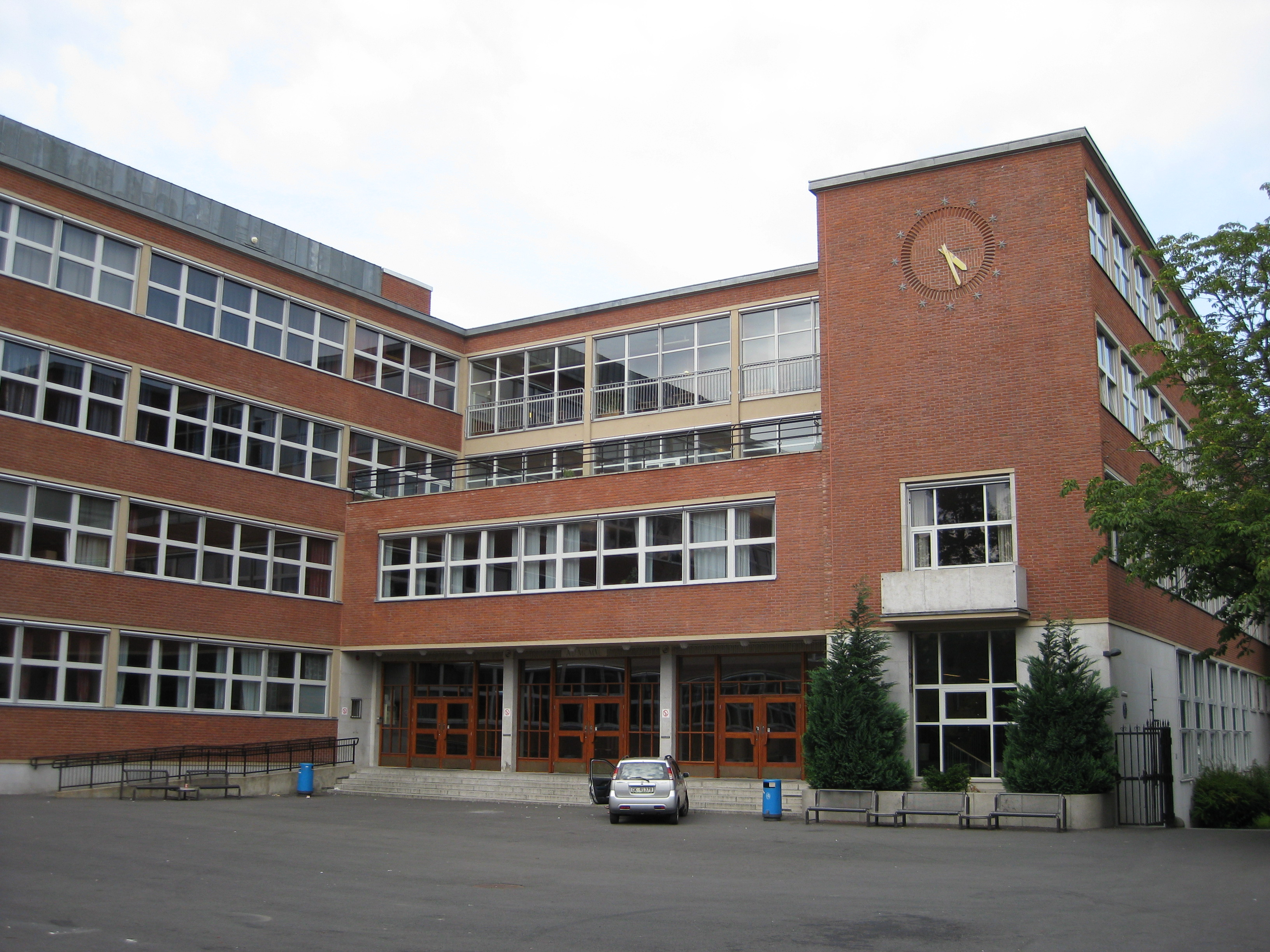
- Four-story L-shaped brick building with ranks of white wood-framed windows; a parking lot in foreground. Two four-metre conifers are planted in containers at the front. On the right part of the "L" a wheelchair ramp and broad steps across the width of the building provide access to three double doors. The top two storeys are partially set back from the main façade. On the rightmost part of the building is an oversized modern clock face set into the brick.

Location
- Parkveien 65; Oslo; Norway
- Coordinates: 59°54′49.9″N 10°43′12.6″E

Information
- Type: Upper secondary school
- Motto: Læring i sentrum (Learning at the centre)
- Established: 1875
- School district: Frogner
- Rector: Trond Lien
- Language: Norwegian
- Hours in school day: 8:00–15:30
- Campus type: Urban
- Alumni: Gustav Henriksen; Siv Jensen; Per-Kristian Foss
- Website: ohg.vgs.no

Oslo Commerce School (Norw. Oslo Handelsgymnasium) is a full-time public school in Oslo, Norway, specialising in the teaching of financial and business management.

The school was founded in 1875 as Christiania Commerce School (Norw. Christiania Handelsgymnasium) with the goal of enabling young people "who had settled on a career in commerce or other practical vocations" to receive "a complete theoretical and practical education in commercial subjects as well as a higher education in other subjects."

== Growth and diversification ==
The first 32 students graduated in 1877. Until Norwegian School of Economics and Business Administration (Norges Handelshøyskole) in Bergen was established in 1936, Oslo Commerce School provided the highest level of commercial education available in Norway. The number of pupils has increased steadily since then, especially after a 1950 reform gave economics and commerce courses the same recognition as the traditional high school subjects, and provided the right for its graduates to study at universities and colleges. This avenue of entry to post-secondary studies became popular, and after a few years many traditional upper secondary schools began offering programs in economics and commerce as well.

The first students for the new Arts and Sciences curriculum began studies in 1977; the first class graduated in 1980. When Frogner Upper Secondary School closed, 13 class groups studying commerce and office/clerical programs transferred to Oslo Commerce School; the remaining students transferred to Hartvig Nissen School. From the 2002–03 school year, the school has included programs in training for the service sector, for the travel industry, for transport and logistics and for information technology. In addition, the school caters to special-needs students and offers two preparatory class groups for minority-language students.

== School library ==
The school library has approximately 9,000 books, including fiction and non-fiction, and subscribes to three newspapers and several journals. The library has sections for poetry and novels, as well as audiobooks and foreign-language fiction in English, French, Spanish and German.

== School locations ==
At its 1875 founding the school was located at Rosenkrantz-gaten 7. Later, before the present building at Parkveien 65 was completed in 1946, the school's pupils were housed at Munchsgaten 4. The original school had been used as a command center for the occupying Germans during World War II. The Germans added a bunker, which is today used as a museum.

The current building was designed by the architectural partners Gudolf Blakstad and Herman Munthe-Kaas and was largely financed through private funds and donations.
