= Jan E. Mellbye =

Norwegian politician

Jan Egeberg Mellbye (13 July 1913 – 19 February 2009) was a Norwegian farmer and politician for the Centre Party.

He was born in Nes Municipality as a son of politician Johan E. Mellbye (1866–1954) and Emelie Pettersson (1879–1954). He was married to Tora Bjørn-Hansen (1921–1968), a daughter of ship-owner Arne Bjørn-Hansen.

He graduated from Oslo Commerce School in 1932 and Jønsberg Agricultural School in 1934. After practising agronomy in Sweden he also worked as a bookkeeper. From 1938 he managed the family farm, the former noble seat Grefsheim, and owned it from 1947.

He was a member of the municipal council of Nes Municipality from 1948 to 1962. He was a board member of the Norwegian Agrarian Association from 1958 to 1965, and chaired the organization from 1969 to 1974. He was later an honorary member.

He also chaired Selskapet Ny Jord from 1961 to 1976, Landkredittforeningen from 1968 to 1981, Hedemarken Potetmelfabrikk from 1969 and Centralkassen for Bøndernes Driftskreditt from 1970. After the merger of Ny Jord and Det Norske Myrselskap in 1976, he was deputy chair of the new Det norske jord- og myrselskap until 1986. He died in February 2009.

Preceded by Johan A. Vikan	Chairman of the Norwegian Agrarian Association; 1969–1974	Succeeded by Hans Haga
