= Rossabø Church =

Church in Rogaland, Norway

- Rossabø kyrkje
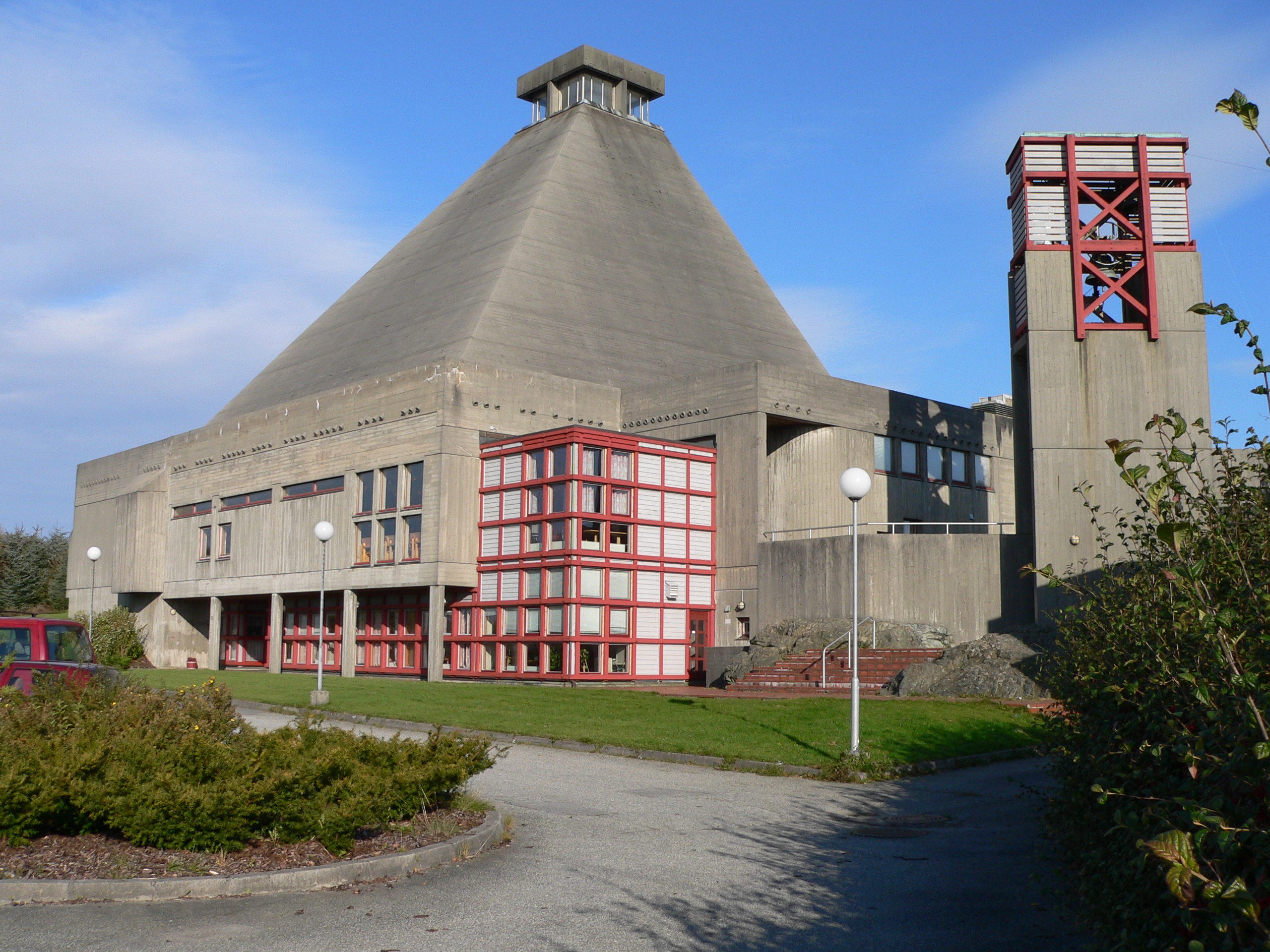
- View of the church
- Rossabø Church
- 59.393745°N 5.288459°E
- Location: Haugesund Municipality, Rogaland
- Country: Norway
- Denomination: Church of Norway
- Churchmanship: Evangelical Lutheran

History
- Status: Parish church
- Founded: 1972
- Consecrated: 1972

Architecture
- Functional status: Active
- Architect(s): Per Amund Riseng and Jan Stensrud
- Architectural type: Fan-shaped
- Style: Modern
- Completed: 1972 (54 years ago)

Specifications
- Capacity: 600
- Materials: Concrete

Administration
- Diocese: Stavanger bispedømme
- Deanery: Haugaland prosti
- Parish: Rossabø

Rossabø Church (Norwegian: Rossabø kyrkje) is a parish church of the Church of Norway in Haugesund Municipality in Rogaland county, Norway. It is located in the southern part of the town of Haugesund. It is the church for the Rossabø parish which is part of the Haugaland prosti (deanery) in the Diocese of Stavanger. The modern-style, concrete church was built in a fan-shaped style in 1972 using designs by the architects Per Amund Riseng and Jan Stensrud. The church seats about 360 people, but can be expanded up to 600 people.

== See also ==
- List of churches in Rogaland
