= Hans Haga =

Norwegian agrarian leader

Hans Haga (8 December 1924 – 22 June 2008) was a Norwegian agrarian leader.

He spent most of his career in the Norwegian Agrarian Association. He was first hired as a secretary for the county chapter in Oppland in 1952, and became press consultant nationally in 1954. In 1965 he became a member of the board, from 1974 to 1980 he was chairman of the organization and from 1980 to 1988 he was secretary general. He then worked as an advisor until retiring in 1992. For many years, the Norwegian Agrarian Association had cose ties with the Centre Party.

Hans Haga hailed from Nannestad, but settled in Nes. He died in a nursing home there.

Hans Haga was the father of former Centre Party leader Åslaug Haga.

Preceded by Jan E. Mellbye	Chairman of the Norwegian Agrarian Association; 1974–1980	Succeeded by Nils Valla
Preceded by	Secretary general of the Norwegian Agrarian Association; 1980–1988	Succeeded by
