= Kunstnernes Hus =

Art gallery in Oslo, Norway

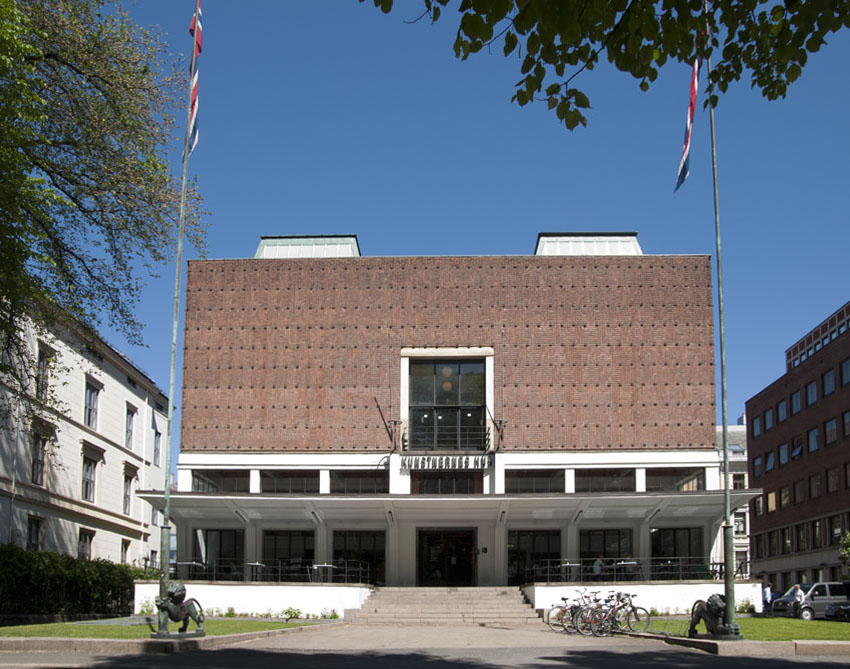
- Interactive map of the Kunstnernes Hus area

General information
- Architectural style: Functionalism
- Location: Oslo, Norway
- Coordinates: 59.9193°N 10.7306°E
- Construction started: 1929
- Completed: 1 October 1930
- Client: Bildende Kunstneres Styre

Design and construction
- Architects: Gudolf Blakstad and Herman Munthe-Kaas

Kunstnernes Hus (Norwegian for "Artists' House") is an art gallery in Oslo, Norway. It is Norway's largest gallery under the direction of artists, and has served as a major center for exhibits of Norwegian and international contemporary art. It is also a prominent example of Functionalist architecture situated in Wergelandsveien 17, across the Royal palace park.

After having raised funds and interest for several years, Bildende Kunstneres Styre (now Norwegian Visual Artists Association) acquired the site for its headquarters in 1927 and opened an architectural contest in 1928. Several important specifications were imposed on entries, among them natural light from the ceiling, limited building height, and a façade that blended with the surrounding architecture. Its architecture is noted as an important milestone in the transition from the legacy of 19th century Neoclassical architecture to 20th century Functionalism.

Over 60 proposals were submitted, and the winning proposal, named Felix, by Gudolf Blakstad and Herman Munthe-Kaas, was simplified before construction began in 1929. The building opened on 1 October 1930 as an independent foundation with public support. In 1931 it won the Houen Prize for excellent architecture.

It was renovated in 2000/2001 at a cost of about NOK 20 million to improve the galleries, the general structural and aesthetic integrity, and bring safety infrastructure to modern standards.

Kunstnernes Hus is governed by a five-member board, four elected by the Norwegian Visual Artists Association, and one from the Ministry of Culture.

In addition to numerous shows throughout the year, it is one of two sites for the annual art show Høstutstillingen and also the annual fellowship application exhibit. Several pieces are on permanent display, including the bronze lion sculptures at the entrance by Ørnulf Bast, a relief by Niels Larsen Stevns, and pieces by Per Krogh and Lars Backer. There are galleries on two floors. There is also an eating establishment on the ground floor.
