= Jens Christian Mellbye =

Norwegian judge (1914–1993)

Jens Christian Mellbye (4 February 1914 – 31 March 1993) was a Norwegian judge. He served as a Supreme Court Justice from 1968 to 1992.

He was born in Oslo as a son of barrister Gunnar Lange Mellbye (1884–1958) and Aagot Maartmann-Moe (1888–1980). He was a brother of Fredrik Mellbye, grandson of Christian Mellbye and first cousin once removed of Johan E. Mellbye. He finished his secondary education at Ris in 1931 and attended the Norwegian Military Academy from 1931 to 1932. He gradually advanced to Captain. In 1938 he took the cand.jur. degree. He was a deputy judge in Skien District Court before being hired as junior solicitor in his father's law firm. He was a barrister with access to working with Supreme Court cases from 1946. During the legal purge in Norway after World War II, Mellbye served as a public prosecutor from 1945 to 1946 and prosecutor in the Supreme Court from 1946 to 1951.

He was a defender in Oslo City Court from 1951 to 1961, and in the Supreme Court from 1961 to 1968. He was the chairman of the Norwegian Bar Association from 1965 to 1968. He also chaired the Intelligence Oversight Committee for many years. From 1968 to 1992 he served as a Supreme Court Justice.

Mellbye was decorated as a Commander of the Royal Norwegian Order of St. Olav in 1978. He had three children with his wife Ellen Ring Hartmann, whom he married in 1939. He died in March 1993 in Oslo.
