= Udland Church =

Church in Rogaland, Norway

- Udland kirke
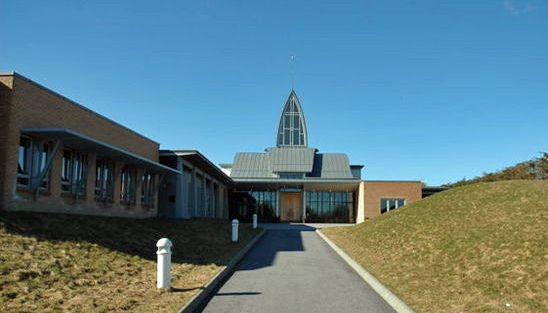
- View of the church
- Udland Church
- 59.438303°N 5.270160°E
- Location: Haugesund Municipality, Rogaland
- Country: Norway
- Denomination: Church of Norway
- Churchmanship: Evangelical Lutheran

History
- Status: Parish church
- Founded: 2002
- Consecrated: 2002

Architecture
- Functional status: Active
- Architect: Thomas Brekke
- Architectural type: Rectangular
- Style: Modern
- Completed: 2002 (24 years ago)

Specifications
- Capacity: 450
- Materials: Brick

Administration
- Diocese: Stavanger bispedømme
- Deanery: Haugaland prosti
- Parish: Skåre

Udland Church (Norwegian: Udland kirke) is a parish church of the Church of Norway in Haugesund Municipality in Rogaland county, Norway. It is located in the town of Haugesund. It is one of the two churches for the Skåre parish which is part of the Haugaland prosti (deanery) in the Diocese of Stavanger. The white, brick church was built in a rectangular style in 2002 using designs by the architect Thomas Brekke. The church seats about 450 people.

== Media gallery ==
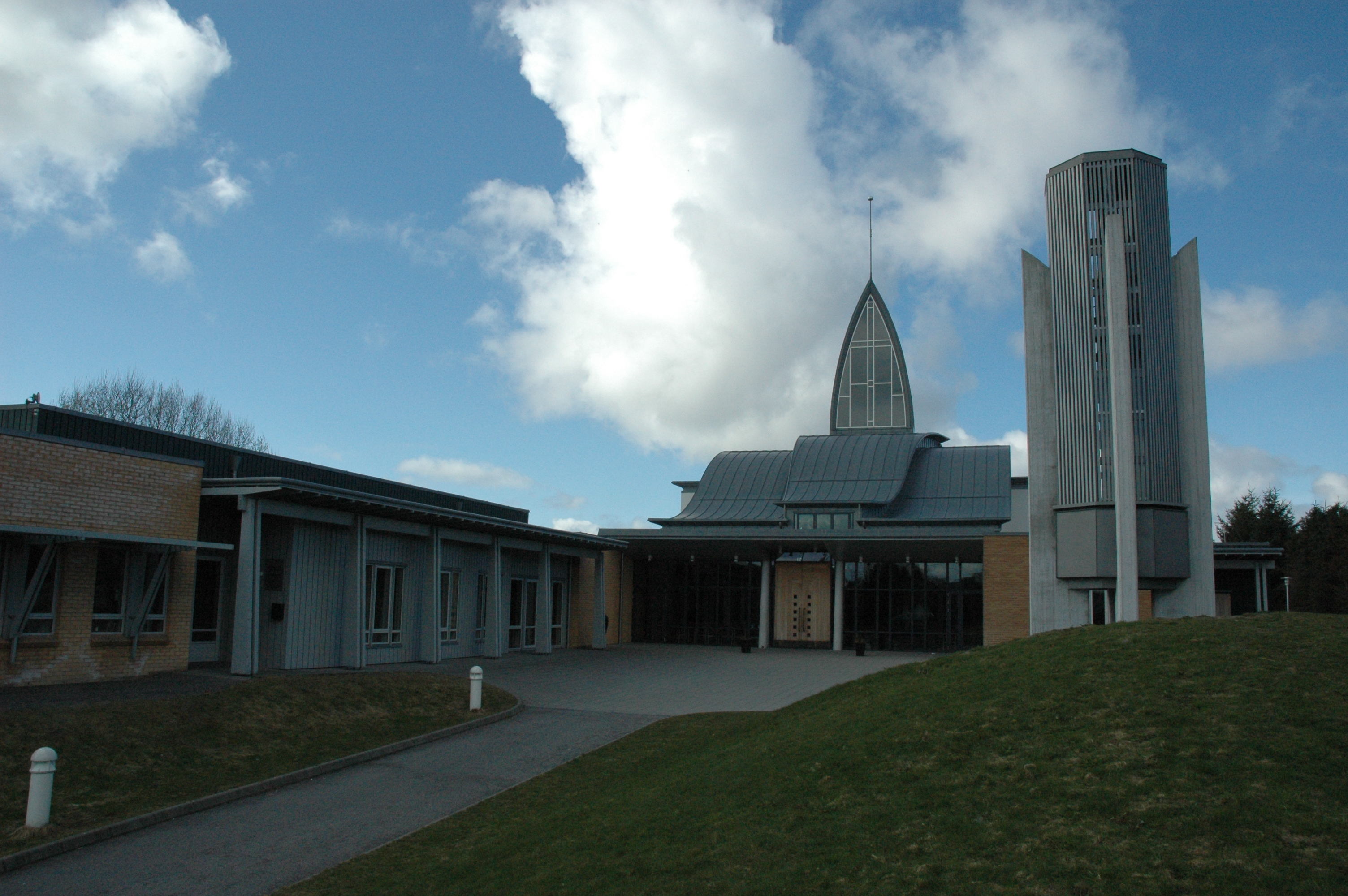

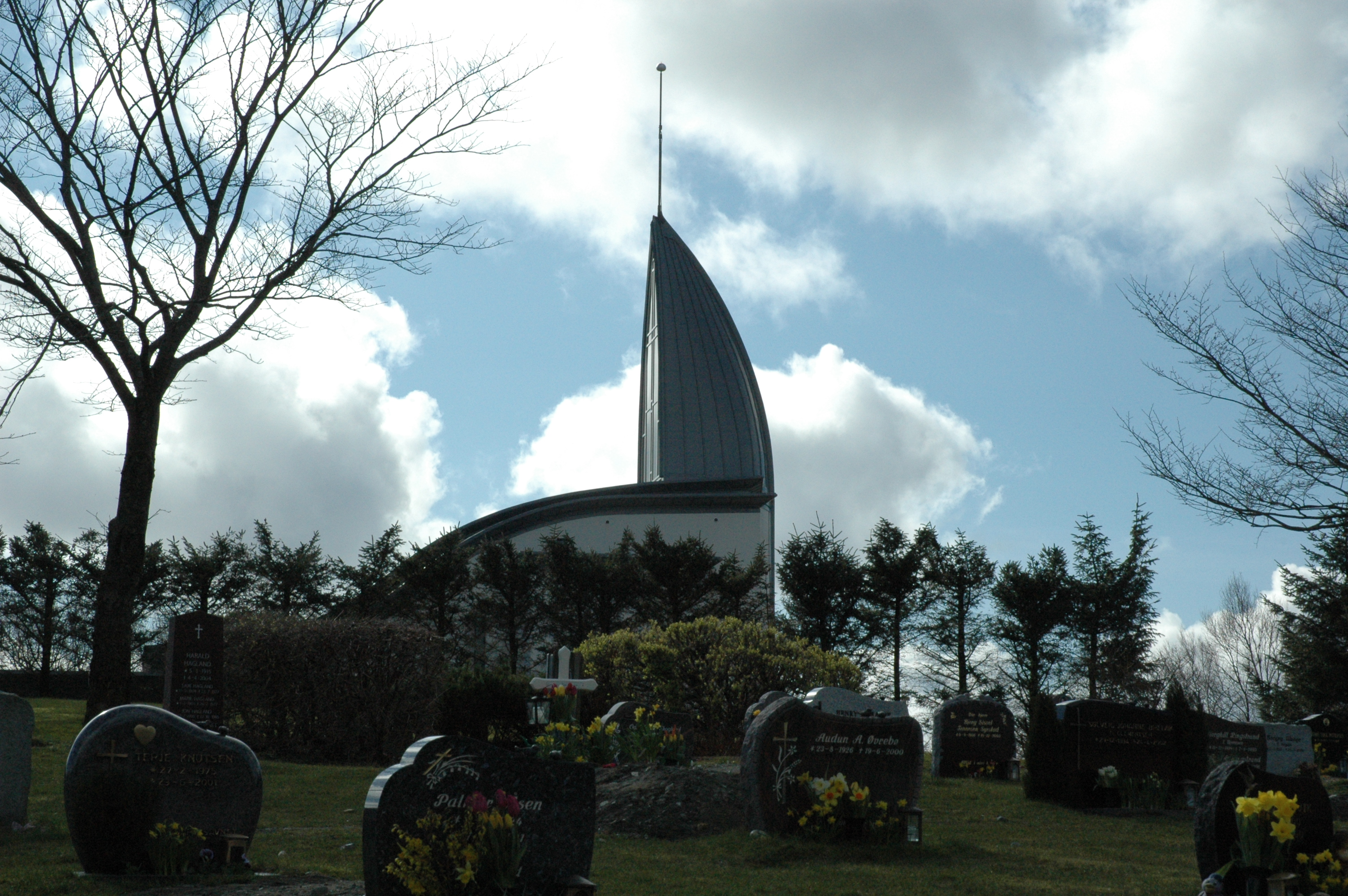

== See also ==
- List of churches in Rogaland
