= Nils Valla =

Norwegian athlete and politician

Nils Agnar Valla (born 1 March 1936) was a Norwegian agrarian leader and politician for the Centre Party.

He hails from and resides in Bjerka in Hemnes Municipality. He was born in Korgen, and is a brother of Gerd-Liv Valla. He was an able track and field athlete in his youth, among others achieving 56.1 seconds in the 400 metres hurdles and 43.70 metres (143.4 ft) in the discus throw. He and his sister represented the club Mo IL.

He was a farmer from 1965 until retiring in 2000. He chaired the Norwegian Agrarian Association from 1980 to 1987, was the director of agricultural insurance in Gjensidige from 1987 to 1995 and served as mayor of Hemnes from 1995 to 1999. Internationally he was a board member of the International Federation of Agricultural Producers.

Preceded by Hans Haga	Chairman of the Norwegian Agrarian Association; 1980–1987	Succeeded by Kåre Syrstad
