= Skåre Municipality =

Former municipality in Rogaland, Norway

Skåre Municipality Skåre herred
- Former municipality
- Skaare herred (historic name)
- Rogaland within Norway

- Skåre within Rogaland
- Coordinates: 59°25′10″N 05°15′48″E
- Country: Norway
- County: Rogaland
- District: Haugaland
- Established: 1 Nov 1881
  - Preceded by: Torvastad Municipality
- Disestablished: 1 Jan 1958
  - Succeeded by: Haugesund Municipality
- Administrative centre: Skåre

Government
  - Mayor (1951–1957): Trygve Andersen (Ap)

Area (upon dissolution)
  - Total: 68.4 km^{2} (26.4 sq mi)
  - Rank: #593 in Norway
- Highest elevation: 245.87 m (806.7 ft)

Population (1957)
  - Total: 6,414
  - Rank: #106 in Norway
  - Density: 93.8/km^{2} (243/sq mi)
- Demonym: Skårebu

Official language
  - Norwegian form: Neutral
- Time zone: UTC+01:00 (CET)
  - Summer (DST): UTC+02:00 (CEST)
- ISO 3166 code: NO-1153

Skåre is a former municipality in Rogaland county, Norway. The 68.4-square-kilometre (26.4 sq mi) municipality existed from 1881 until its dissolution in 1958. The area is now part of Haugesund Municipality in the traditional district of Haugaland. The administrative centre was the village of Skare, located just north of the town of Haugesund. Originally, Skåre Municipality encompassed the far northwestern corner of Rogaland county on the mainland, plus several islands off the western coast. Today, the name Skåre refers to the northern part of the town of Haugesund.

Prior to its dissolution in 1958, the 68.4-square-kilometre (26.4 sq mi) municipality was the 593rd largest by area out of the 744 municipalities in Norway. Skåre Municipality was the 106th most populous municipality in Norway with a population of about 6,414. The municipality's population density was 93.8 inhabitants per square kilometre (243/sq mi).

== General information ==
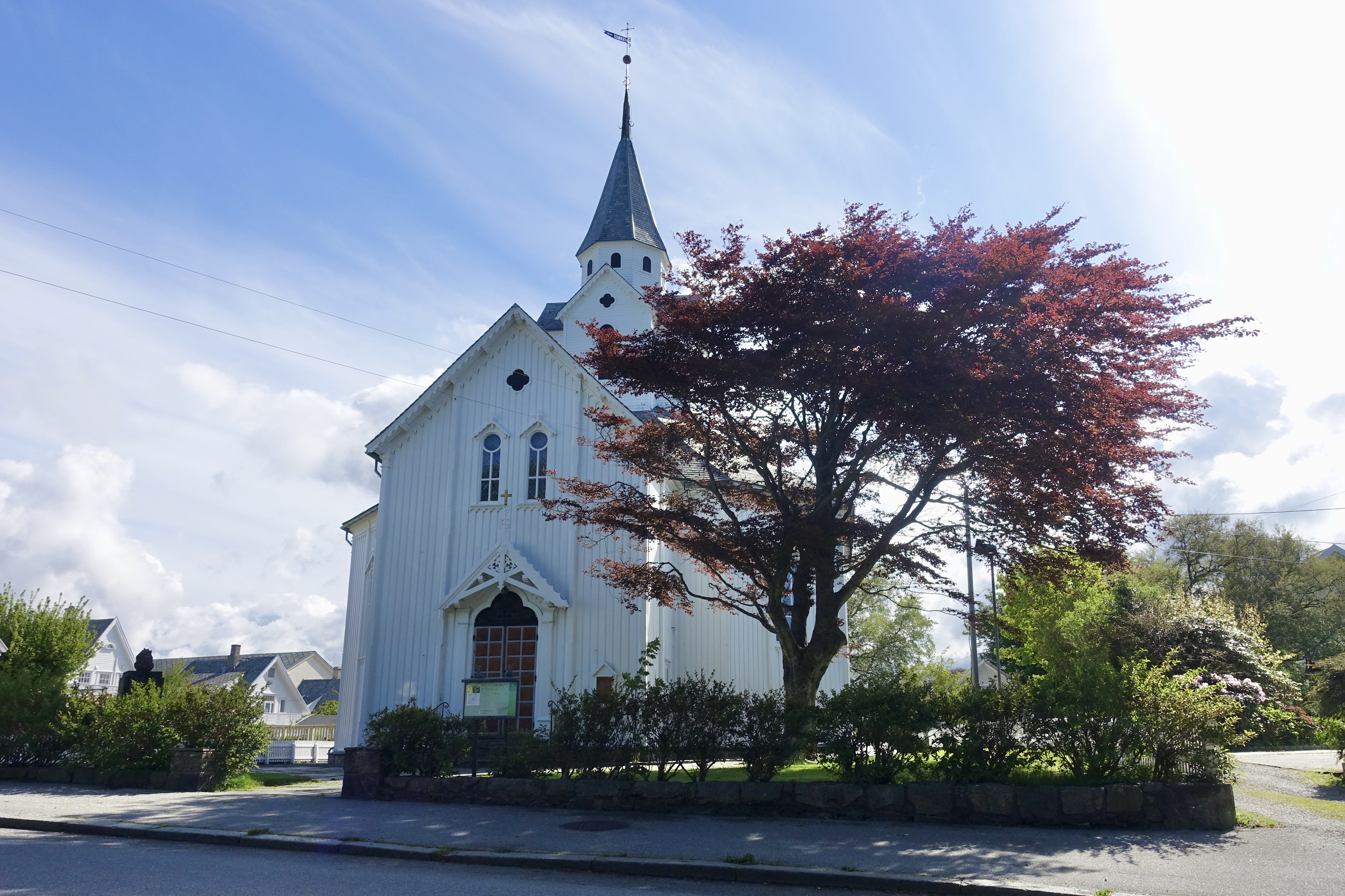
View of Skåre Church

The municipality of Skaare (later, the spelling was changed to Skåre) was created on 1 November 1881 when it was split off from the large Torvastad Municipality. The new municipality had a population of 1,665. On 1 January 1911, a part of Skåre Municipality (population: 3,847) bordering the neighboring town of Haugesund was transferred to Haugesund. On 1 January 1958, the rest of Skåre Municipality (population: 6,772) was merged with the town of Haugesund, creating a much larger Haugesund Municipality.

=== Name ===
The municipality (originally the parish) is named after the old Skara farm (Old Norse: Skára) since the first Skåre Church was built there. The name likes derives from the word skor which means "a rift in a rock".

On 21 December 1917, a royal resolution enacted the 1917 Norwegian language reforms. Prior to this change, the name was spelled Skaare with the digraph "aa", and after this reform, the name was spelled Skåre, using the letter å instead.

=== Churches ===
The Church of Norway had one parish (sokn) within Skåre Municipality. At the time of the municipal dissolution, it was part of the Haugesund prestegjeld and the Karmsund prosti (deanery) in the Diocese of Stavanger.

Churches in Skåre Municipality
Parish (sokn)	Church name	Location of the church	Year built
Skåre	Skåre Church	Skåre	1858

== Geography ==
The municipality was located in the far northwestern border area of Rogaland county. It included land on the mainland plus the Røvær islands. The highest point in the municipality was the 245.87-metre (806.7 ft) tall mountain Klauv in the northeast corner of the municipality. Sveio Municipality (in Hordaland county) was located to the north, Skjold Municipality was located to the east, Avaldsnes Municipality was located to the southeast, Torvastad Municipality was located to the south, Haugesund Municipality was located to the southwest, the North Sea was located to the west, and Bømlo Municipality was located to the northwest in Hordaland county.

== Government ==
While it existed, Skåre Municipality was responsible for primary education (through 10th grade), outpatient health services, senior citizen services, welfare and other social services, zoning, economic development, and municipal roads and utilities. The municipality was governed by a municipal council of directly elected representatives. The mayor was indirectly elected by a vote of the municipal council. The municipality was under the jurisdiction of the Karmsund District Court and the Gulating Court of Appeal.

=== Municipal council ===
The municipal council (Herredsstyre) of Skåre Municipality was made up of 25 representatives that were elected to four year terms. The tables below show the historical composition of the council by political party.

Skåre herredsstyre 1955–1957
Party name (in Norwegian)	Number of representatives
Labour Party (Arbeiderpartiet)	11
Conservative Party (Høyre)	5
Christian Democratic Party (Kristelig Folkeparti)	2
Farmers' Party (Bondepartiet)	3
Liberal Party (Venstre)	4
Total number of members:	25

Skåre herredsstyre 1951–1955
Party name (in Norwegian)	Number of representatives
Labour Party (Arbeiderpartiet)	7
Christian Democratic Party (Kristelig Folkeparti)	1
Farmers' Party (Bondepartiet)	2
Liberal Party (Venstre)	3
Local List(s) (Lokale lister)	3
Total number of members:	16

Skåre herredsstyre 1947–1951
Party name (in Norwegian)	Number of representatives
Labour Party (Arbeiderpartiet)	7
Christian Democratic Party (Kristelig Folkeparti)	1
Farmers' Party (Bondepartiet)	2
Liberal Party (Venstre)	3
Local List(s) (Lokale lister)	3
Total number of members:	16

Skåre herredsstyre 1945–1947
Party name (in Norwegian)	Number of representatives
Labour Party (Arbeiderpartiet)	8
Joint list of the Liberal Party (Venstre) and the Radical People's Party (Radikale Folkepartiet)	2
Local List(s) (Lokale lister)	6
Total number of members:	16

Skåre herredsstyre 1937–1941*
Party name (in Norwegian)	Number of representatives
Labour Party (Arbeiderpartiet)	4
Conservative Party (Høyre)	1
Farmers' Party (Bondepartiet)	3
Liberal Party (Venstre)	7
Local List(s) (Lokale lister)	1
Total number of members:	16
Note: Due to the German occupation of Norway during World War II, no elections were held for new municipal councils until after the war ended in 1945.

=== Mayors ===
The mayor (Nynorsk: ordførar) of Skåre Municipality was the political leader of the municipality and the chairperson of the municipal council. The following people have held this position:

- 1881–1893: Haagen J. Storsteen
- 1894–1895: Ole Heljesen
- 1896–1901: Arne Lothe
- 1902–1916: Ole Huglen
- 1917–1919: Torjus Larsen Gard
- 1920–1928: Johan Steinnes
- 1928–1931: Torleif O. Gaard
- 1931–1937: Torjus Larsen Gard
- 1937–1941: Svein Steinsnes (Bp)
- 1941–1941: Ole Skiftun
- 1941–1945: Berge Borgtveit
- 1945–1946: Svein Steinsnes (Bp)
- 1946–1947: Trygve Andersen (Ap)
- 1947–1951: Svein Steinsnes (Bp)
- 1951–1957: Trygve Andersen (Ap)

== See also ==
- List of former municipalities of Norway
