= Johan A. Vikan =

Norwegian politician

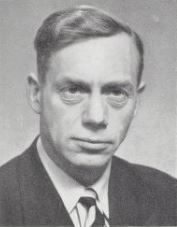
Johan A. Vikan

Johan A. Vikan (20 April 1912, Stjørdal Municipality – 16 July 1997) was a Norwegian politician for the Centre Party.

He was elected to the Norwegian Parliament from Nord-Trøndelag in 1969, and was re-elected on one occasion.

On the local level he was mayor of Stjørdal Municipality from 1951 to 1955 and 1959 to 1966. From 1963 to 1966 he was also county mayor of Nord-Trøndelag.

Outside politics he worked in agriculture. In the Norwegian Agrarian Association he was a member of the board from 1958, was deputy chairman from 1959 to 1963 and chairman from 1966 to 1969.

Political offices
New post	County mayor of Nord-Trøndelag; 1963–1966	Succeeded by Olav Benum
Other offices
Preceded by Hallvard Eika	Chairman of the Norwegian Agrarian Association; 1966–1969	Succeeded by Jan E. Mellbye
