= Johan Syrstad =

Norwegian politician (1924–2019)

Johan Syrstad (3 February 1924 – 16 December 2019) was a Norwegian politician for the Centre Party.

He was born in Meldal Municipality as a son of Ivar Syrstad (1893–1973) and Johanna Syrstadeng (1898–1999). He attended folk high school from 1941 to 1942, took the examen artium in 1946 and one-year economical and agricultural schools. From 1950 to his retirement in 1988 he owned and operated the family farm Syrstad. He was also director of the local savings bank from 1983 to 1991.

He was a member of the municipal council of Meldal Municipality from 1955 to 1975, the last twelve years in the executive committee. He chaired the county party chapter from 1960 to 1966. He served as a deputy representative to the Parliament of Norway from Sør-Trøndelag during the terms 1961–1965, 1965–1969, 1969–1973 and 1973–1977. From 1968 to 1971 he moved up as a regular representative, filling in for Per Borten who led Borten's Cabinet. From 1972 to 1973 he filled in for Einar Hole Moxnes who was appointed to Korvald's Cabinet. Syrstad was then elected to Parliament in 1977, and re-elected in 1981. He was chief whip of his party from 1969 to 1971, and his most prestigious committee position was as deputy chair of the Standing Committee on Agriculture from 1981 to 1985.

He was deputy chair of the Norwegian State Agriculture Bank's council from 1965 to 1979, and also chair of Meldal Sparebank from 1968 to 1983. Around this time he also sat in the Frostating Court of Appeal. He was later a board member of Pengelotteriet from 1985 to 1992. As a Lutheran Christian he was a member of the local congregational council in Meldal from 1954 to 1973 and 1985 to 1988, chairing it from 1967 to 1973 and briefly in 1986. He was also a national board member of the Norwegian Missionary Society from 1972 to 1978, later leader of its protocol committee from 1990 to 1993.

However, his career mainly centred on the dairy farmers' organizations. From 1951 to 1969 he chaired the supervisory council of the local dairy Meldal Meieri, and from 1968 to 1978 he chaired the regional copperative Trøndelag melkesentral. In the nationwide cooperative Norske Meieriers Salgssentral he became a board member in 1971, advanced to deputy chair in 1975 and chairman from 1978 to 1982. He was also a board member of Norske Melkeprodusenters Landsforbund from 1971, and chair from 1978 to 1981. These two organizations merged in 1999 to form the cooperative Tine. Incidentally, Johan Syrstad's neighbor Kåre Syrstad had then served as chair of the cooperative since 1991. Johan Syrstad was also a board member of Landbrukets Sentralforbund from 1978 to 1981 and a supervisory council member of the Norwegian Agrarian Association from 1975 to 1982.
