= Fredrik Mellbye =

Norwegian physician

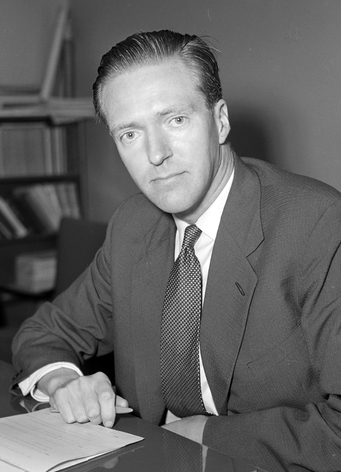
Fredrik Mellbye

Fredrik Mellbye (15 February 1917 – 4 January 1999) was a Norwegian physician.

He was the brother of judge Jens Christian Mellbye. He served as chief medical officer in Tromsø from 1946 to 1952, national chief physician for hygiene in the Norwegian Directorate for Health from 1950 to 1972 and chief medical officer (stadsfysikus) in Oslo from 1972 to 1985.

He chaired the board of NAVF from 1979 to 1982, as well as Nasjonalforeningen for folkehelsen from 1985 to 1988 and Landsforeningen mot AIDS from 1986 to 1987. He was awarded the St. Hallvard Medal in 1986.
