= Kåre Syrstad =

Norwegian agrarian leader (1939–2013)

Kåre Syrstad (12 April 1939 – 3 February 2013) was a Norwegian agrarian leader.

He was a board member of Sør-Trøndelag Agrarian Association from 1975, and advanced to chairman from 1979 to 1984. He was also a deputy board member of the Norwegian Agrarian Association from 1981 to 1984, being board member from 1985 and chairman from 1987 to 1991.

In 1983 he became a supervisory council member of Norske Melkeprodusenters Landsforbund. He was a board member from 1984 to 1999, serving as chairman for the last eight years. The organization merged with Norske Meieriers Salgssentral in 1999 to form the cooperative Tine. Syrstad was also a board member of Trøndelag Meieri.

He was a neighbor of politician and agrarian leader Johan Syrstad in Meldal Municipality.

Preceded by Nils Valla	Chairman of the Norwegian Agrarian Association; 1981–1991	Succeeded by Bjørn Iversen
