= Hakon Magne Valdemar Wrangell =

Norwegian shipowner and politician

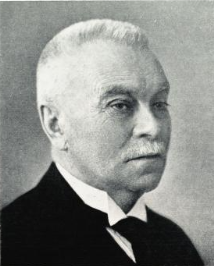
Image of H.M. Wrangell

Hakon Magne Valdemar Wrangell (2 January 1859 – 31 August 1942) was a Norwegian ship owner and politician.

Wrangell was born in Haugesund to telegrapher Hans Marcus Wrangell and Cecilie Tjerandsen. He was elected representative to the Stortinget for the periods 1904–1906, 1907–1909, 1922–1924 and 1925–1927, for the Liberal Left Party. From 1927 to 1930 he was President of the Norwegian Shipowners' Association.
