= Norwegian Agrarian Association =

Norwegian farmers interest organization

Norwegian Agrarian Association Norges Bondelag
- Formation: 6 February 1896
- Type: NGO
- Purpose: Farming
- Headquarters: Oslo
- Region served: Norway
- Members: 60,482 (2022)
- Leader: Bjørn Gimming
- Website: https://bondelaget.no

The Norwegian Agrarian Association (Norwegian: Norges Bondelag) is the largest Norwegian interest organization for farmers.

It functions both as a labour union and as a trade union. It negotiates with the Norwegian Farmers and Smallholders Union and the Norwegian Ministry of Labour and Social Inclusion about agricultural subsidies. It has 61,000 members, with 475 local chapters and 14 county chapters.

The association was established in 1896 as Norges Landmandsforbund. In 1920 the organization decided to create its own political party, the Agrarian Party (now called Centre Party). In 1922 the Norwegian Agrarian Association took its present name. The organization is currently completely independent of the Centre Party.

The association has an official publication, Bondebladet, which is published on a weekly basis.

== Chairman ==
- 1896–1901 Johan Theodor Landmark
- 1901–1905 Johan E. Mellbye
- 1905–1906 Gunnar Knudsen
- 1906–1909 Kleist Gedde
- 1909–1941 Johan E. Mellbye
- 1945–1951 Arne Rostad
- 1951–1955 Ole Rømer Sandberg
- 1955–1966 Hallvard Eika
- 1966–1969 Johan A. Vikan
- 1969–1974 Jan E. Mellbye
- 1974–1980 Hans Haga
- 1980–1987 Nils Valla
- 1987–1991 Kåre Syrstad
- 1991–1997 Bjørn Iversen
- 1997–2002 Kirsten Indgjerd Værdal
- 2002–2008 Bjarne Undheim
- 2008–2009 Pål Haugstad
- 2009–2014 Nils T. Bjørke
- 2014–2021 Lars Petter Bartnes
- 2021– Bjørn Gimming
