= Nils Erik Flakstad (sculptor) =

Nils Flakstad's granite sculpture "Fiskeren" ("The Fisherman", 1941) at Oslo City Hall's west wall.

Nils Erik Flakstad (born 9 August 1907 in Hamar, died on 31 July 1979 in Oslo) was a Norwegian sculptor, son of businessperson and politician Nils Erik Flakstad.

== Education ==
He studied at the Norwegian National Academy of Craft and Art Industry from 1928 to 1930, and at the Norwegian National Academy of Fine Arts from 1930 to 1932.

== Career ==
He was a teacher at the Norwegian National Academy of Craft and Art Industry 1955–1975. He started as a painter and first began in the late 1930s with sculpture. Among his works include contributions at Oslo City Hall, in front of Haugesund City Hall, a relief of the Parliamentary stair hall at Stortinget, and monuments to fallen Norwegian patriots during World War II in Hamar, Haugesund and Akershus Fortress.
