= Johan E. Mellbye =

Norwegian politician (1866–1954)

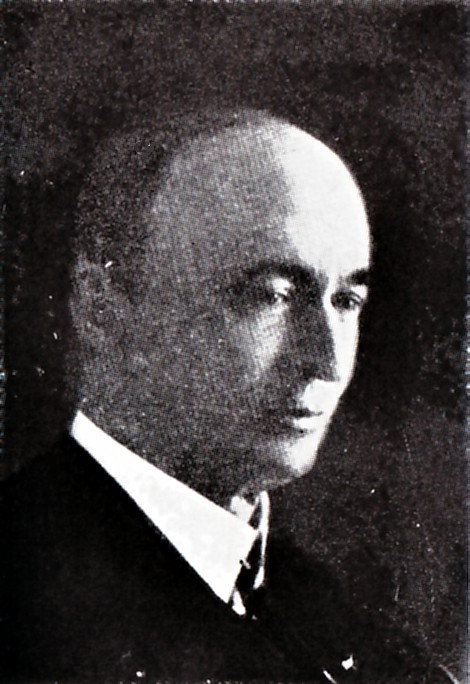

Leader of the Agrarian Party
- In office 1920–1921
- Preceded by: Position established
- Succeeded by: Kristoffer Høgset

Minister of Agriculture
- In office 26 September 1904 – 11 March 1905
- Prime Minister: Francis Hagerup
- Preceded by: Christian Mathiesen
- Succeeded by: Aasmund H. Vinje

Member of the Norwegian Parliament
- In office 1 January 1922 – 31 December 1930
- Constituency: Hedmark

Personal details
- Born: Johan Egeberg Mellbye; 11 November 1866 Christiania, United Kingdoms of Sweden and Norway
- Died: 17 December 1954 (aged 88) Nes, Hedmark, Norway
- Party: Agrarian; Conservative (formerly)
- Spouse: Emilie Pettersson (m. 1906)
- Children: Jan E. Mellbye

Johan Egeberg Mellbye (11 November 1866 – 17 December 1954) was a Norwegian farmer and politician who served as the first leader of the Norwegian Centre Party from 1920 to 1921. He also served as Minister of Agriculture 1904–1905, then representing the Conservative Party.

His son Jan E. Mellbye ran the family farm and became chairman of the Norwegian Agrarian Association and Selskapet Ny Jord.
