= Herman Munthe-Kaas =

Norwegian architect (1890–1977)

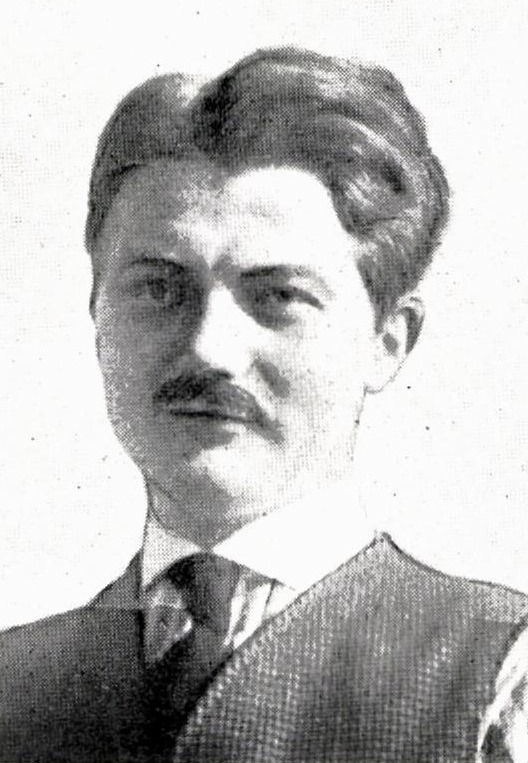
Herman Munthe-Kaas

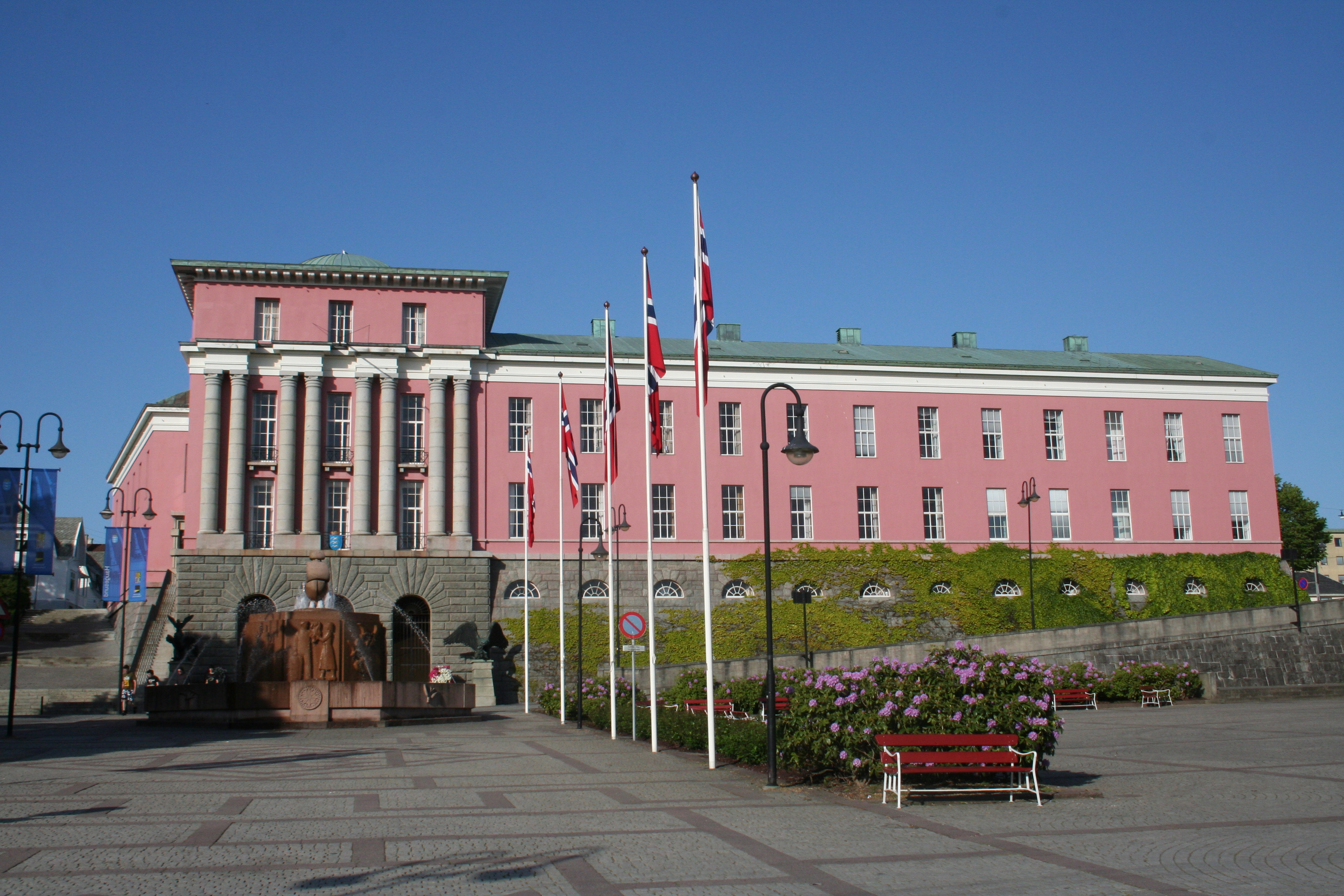
Haugesund City Hall

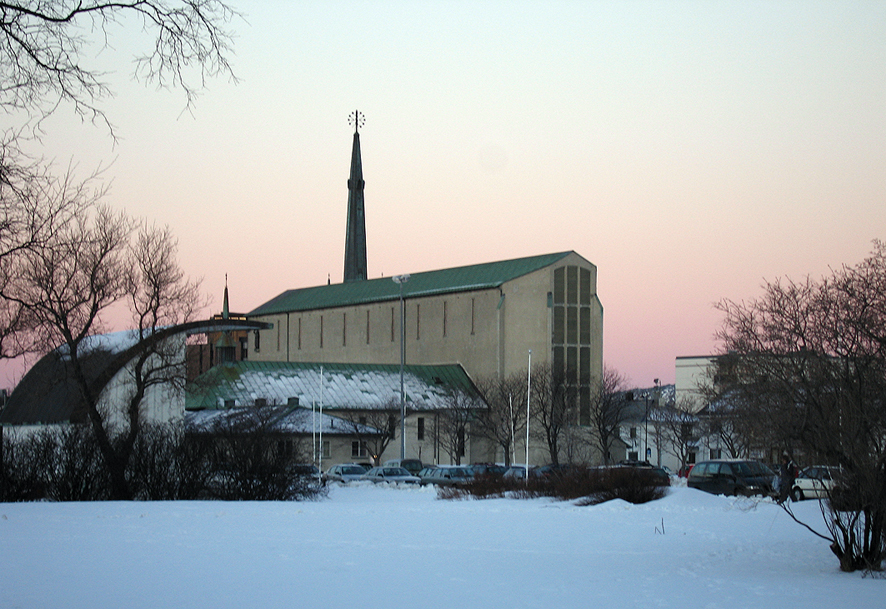
Bodø Cathedral

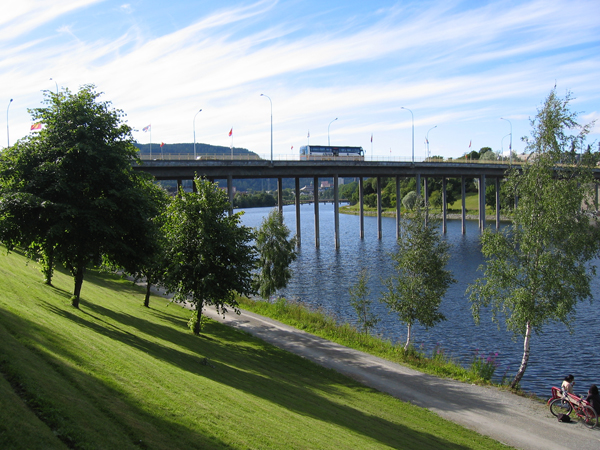
Elgeseter Bridge

Herman Munthe-Kaas (25 May 1890 – 5 May 1977) was a Norwegian architect. He was primarily known for his functionalist building designs.

== Biography ==
Munthe-Kaas was born at Christiania (now Oslo), Norway. He was the son of Marius William Munthe-Kaas (1856-1926) and Hermine Cathrine Blichfeldt (1863-1937). Munthe-Kaas graduated from Kristiania tekniske skole (now Oslo University College) in 1910 and Norwegian National Academy of Craft and Art Industry (Statens Håndverks- og Kunstindustriskole) in 1912. He apprenticed with Arnstein Arneberg from 1916 to 1918. In 1918, Munthe Kaas attended the Royal Institute of Technology in Stockholm and during 1919-20 the Academy of Arts in Copenhagen.

Together with Gudolf Blakstad, he started the architectural firm Blakstad og Munthe-Kaas Arkitekter in 1922. The firm discontinued a few years after Gudolf Blakstad death in 1989. The firm collaborated on several significant assignments in Norway including Kunstnernes Hus for which they were awarded the Houen Foundation Award in 1931.

Their work also included the City Hall in Haugesund (1931), Elgeseter Bridge (1951) in Trondheim, Bodø Cathedral (1956) in the Diocese of Sør-Hålogaland and Alfaset chapel (1972) in Oslo.

== See also ==
- Nordic Classicism

== Other sources ==
- Grønvold, Ulf & Jiří Havran (2000) Priset arkitektur 1904-2000: bygninger belønnet med A.C. Houens fonds diplom (Oslo: Arkitekturforlaget) ISBN 82-7532-014-3
