= Gudolf Blakstad =

Norwegian architect (1893–1985)

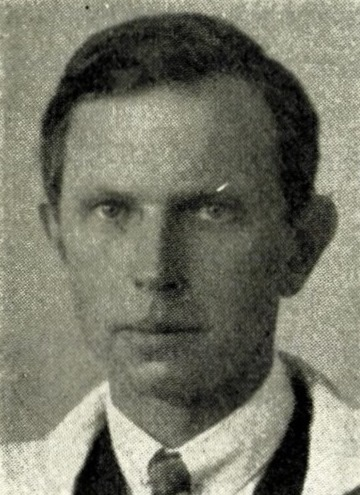
Gudolf Blakstad

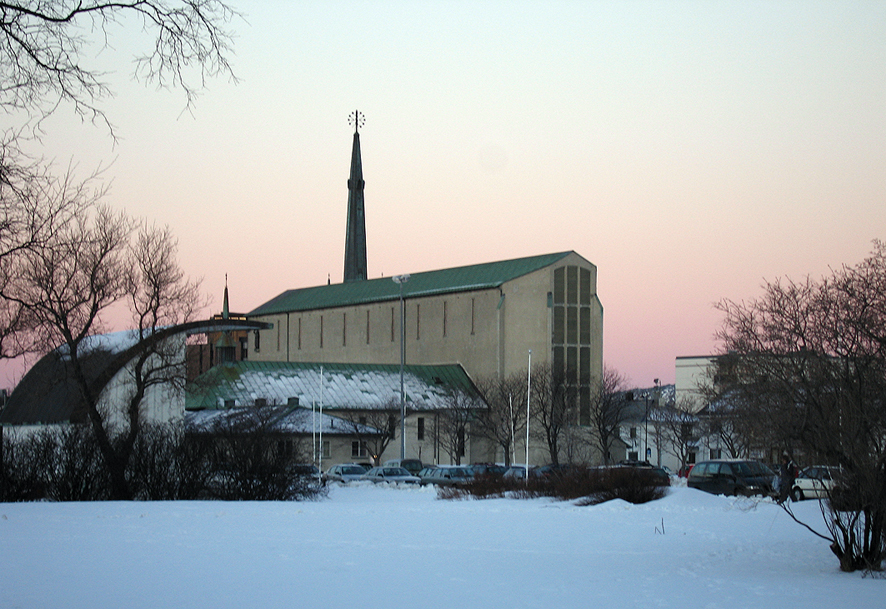
Bodø Cathedral

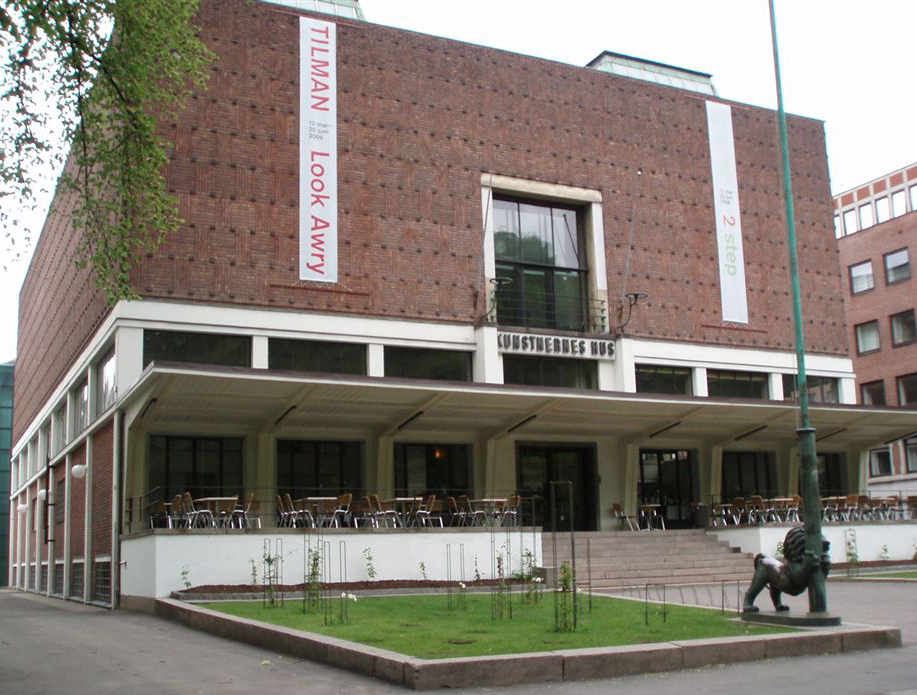
Kunstnernes Hus

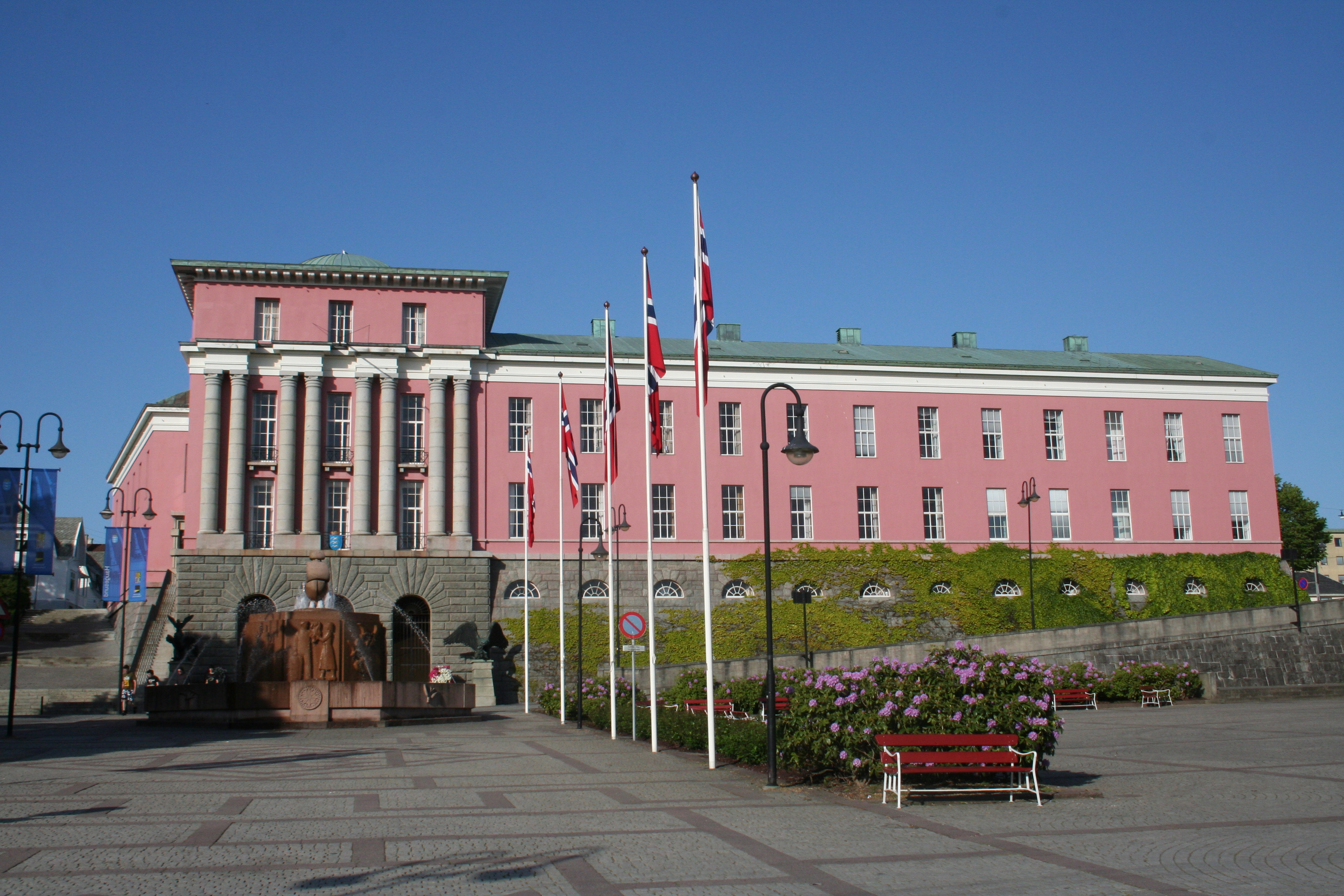
Haugesund City Hall

Gudolf Blakstad (19 May 1893 – 22 November 1985) was a Norwegian architect. He was noted for his work in the transition between neo-classicism and functionalism in Norwegian architecture.

== Biography ==
Blakstad was born in Gjerpen Municipality, Norway. He was the son of Wilhelm Eriksen Blakstad (1863-1963) and Gunvor Kjos (1855-1932). Blakstad was educated at the Norwegian Institute of Technology where he graduated in 1916. In 1921 he married Ragnfrid Matheson Brun, in Kristiana, Norway. From 1922 he started his own practice in Oslo together with Arnstein Arneberg and Herman Munthe-Kaas. He would maintain a partnership with Herman Munthe-Kaas in the architectural firm Blakstad og Munthe-Kaas Arkitekter for more than 50 years. During 1927, Arno Berg, the city antiquarian in Oslo, urged him and other artists and architects to create ideas for enhancing the vibrancy and friendliness of the city's architectural heritage. The artist Henrik Sørensen had the initiative to start this urban development project. During the period 1922–1960, they participated in 66 contests, won prizes in 33 of them, of which all 22 were first prizes. The firm ceased in 1989.

The firm collaborated on several significant assignments in Norway including Kunstnernes Hus for which they were awarded the Houen Foundation Award in 1931. Their work also included the City Hall in Haugesund (1931), Elgeseter Bridge (1951) in Trondheim, Bodø Cathedral (1956) in the Diocese of Sør-Hålogaland and Alfaset chapel (1972) in Oslo. He also drew Det Nye Teater with Jens Gram Dunker.
