= Hanna Brummenæs =

Norwegian businesswoman (1860–1942)

Marthe Johanne (Hanna) Pedersdatter Brummenæs (12 December 1860, Hasseløy – 1 May 1942, Haugesund) was a Norwegian businesswoman in shipping and local politician in Haugesund. Together with Bertha Torgersen, she founded the shipping company Brummenæs & Torgersen in 1909, becoming the first female ship-owners, with a fleet growing to 15 ships. They worked and lived together most of their adult lives.

== Brummenæs & Torgersen ==
Hanna Brummenæs and Bertha Torgersen met each other as employees of a store in the copper mining community at the village Visnes in Norway. They later ran their own store together.

Around 1900 they moved to Haugesund and began to take an interest in shipping. They invested in shipping stocks, and made enough money to buy a herring steamer in 1909. The ship was called "D/S Gouval" and purchased in cash at an auction.

They bought four ships of between 1350 d.w.t. and 3200 d.w.t., three of the ships were built in the 1800s and the latter in 1904. The common denominator that they were mostly in poor condition and slow, causing them to lose all their ships during World War I, except for "Gouval", which sank before the war.

After the war, the ship industry in the city was in poor shape. Brummenæs & Torgersen had paid very little for their five ships and ran the shipping company very responsibly, so they went with a huge profit when the war damage claims were paid.

Between 1921 and 1927 they bought five old ships, and in 1929 they bought a motor ship. This was "Equatore" which was in very poor condition and eventually became a grain store on land.

Before World War II, they bought several old steamers. During the war, all their ships were sunk or lost.

After their deaths, about 6 million kroner remained in the estate. Torgensen had the financial responsibility over the company and it was discovered that there was still money left from the war damage claims after World War I.

== Other ==
Brummenæs and Torgensen operated in a male-dominated industry, dressed in men's clothing and presented as male in dealings with foreign businessmen. They lived together most of their adult lives but were private about their personal relationship, referring to each other as "companions" and is explicitly listed as such in the census despite it not being an official category. Both a non-fiction book and a historical novel based on their lives were published in 2021.

Brummenæs spent ten years in the City Council representing the liberal-conservative party Høyre. She was also active in advancing women's rights.
