= Hasseløya =

Island in Haugesund, Norway

Hasseløya Hasseløy
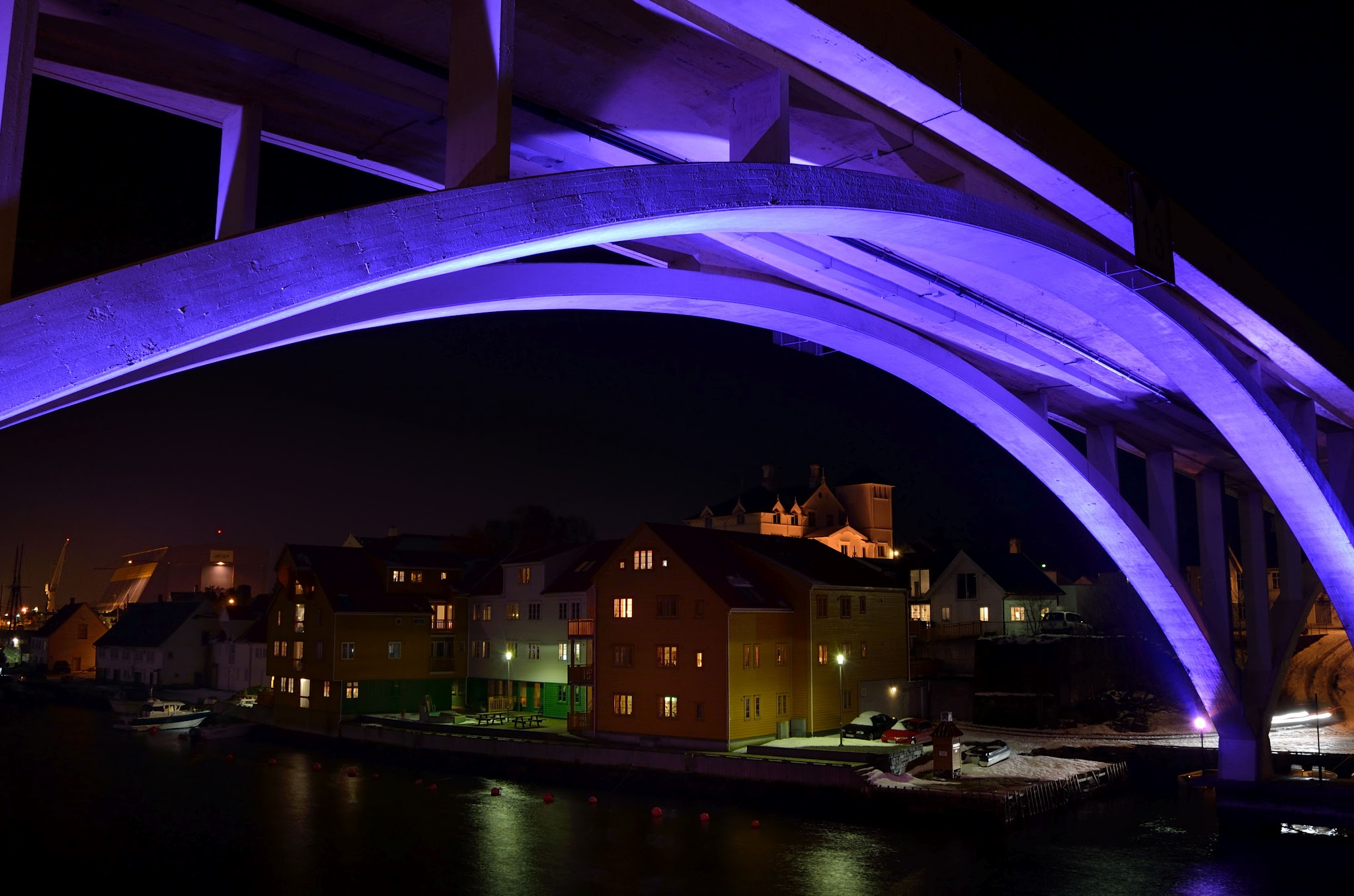
- View of the Hasseløy bridge, connecting the island to the mainland
- Interactive map of the island

Geography
- Location: Rogaland, Norway
- Coordinates: 59.41686°N 5.25344°E
- Area: 0.3 km^{2} (0.12 sq mi)
- Length: 825 m (2707 ft)
- Width: 450 m (1480 ft)

Administration
- Norway
- County: Rogaland
- Municipality: Haugesund Municipality

Demographics
- Population: 1046 (2020)

Hasseløya (or Hasseløy) is an island in Haugesund Municipality in Rogaland county, Norway. The 0.3-square-kilometre (74-acre) island lies north of the island Risøya, south of the Killingøy peninsula, and between the island of Vibrandsøya to the west and the mainland to the east. Hasseløya is part of the town of Haugesund, connected to the city centre by a bridge. The informal name Bakarøy is commonly used locally.

== Population and economy ==
The 2020 population was 1,046. The offices for the western region of the Norwegian Coastal Administration are in the southwest corner of the island. The small Dokken museum with historical boats and buildings is located on the east side, near the bridge.

== History ==
Historically, the island was the site of industries including the shipyard Hauges Jernskibsbyggeri from 1907. Since then the island is mostly residential and several apartment buildings have replaced the old boathouses.

The island has been connected to the mainland since 1872, the current bridge was completed in 1954.

== Notable people ==
Hanna Brummenæs (1860-1942), a pioneering female shipping company owner
