= Vibrandsøya =

Island in Rogaland, Norway

Vibrandsøya Vibrandøya / Vibrandsøy
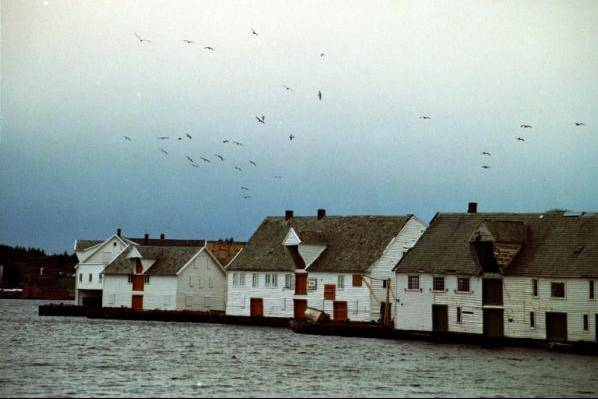
- Old seaside buildings on Vibrandsøy
- Interactive map of the island

Geography
- Location: Rogaland, Norway
- Coordinates: 59.41613°N 5.24327°E

Administration
- Norway
- County: Rogaland
- Municipality: Haugesund Municipality

Vibrandsøya or Vibrandsøy is an island in Haugesund Municipality in Rogaland county, Norway. The island lies west of the densely built-up island of Hasseløya and northwest of the island of Risøya in the town of Haugesund. The island is now used as a recreational area.

The island was part of the old Torvastad Municipality until 1965, and is the only part of the former municipality which was not incorporated into Karmøy Municipality. As such, the island is the newest part of the Haugesund Municipality. The 300-decare (74-acre) property called "Vibrandsøy" includes the smaller neighbouring islands of Gardsøya and Varøy in the north, and Trollholmen to the south-west. These islands are connected together by short bridges and fillings, but the islands have no land connection with the mainland.

== Name ==
The Old Norse form of the name must have been Vébrandsøy. The first element is then the genitive form of the male name Vébrandr and the last element is øy which means 'island'. Historically, the island was called Vibrandsøy, although now the preferred spelling is Vibrandsøya.

== History ==
Farming on Vibrandsøy is believed to have commenced already in the Middle Ages, but the Black Death left the island unpopulated until at least 1567. The island and its farm was sold by the church to the private person Isak Davidsson in 1652. The island became part of the Torvastad municipality in 1837. In 1872, the brothers John and Ole Andreas Knutsen purchased the island at auction. The island remained in the family's hands until ship-owner Ole Andreas Knudsen died in 1993.

In 1875, the island had a population of 58. The shipping workshop Møllerodden was established in 1958, and upheld the island's activity for 30 years. Farming continued on the island until 1974.

=== 2009 sale and public ownership ===
After some legal disputes concerning the estate, the Haugaland District Court ruled in 2008 that the property be sold. Several politicians, including Haugesund's mayor opined that the municipality and Norwegian government should purchase Vibrandsøy. There were concerns that the municipality, which administers zoning regulations, would zone large areas of the island for recreational purposes, thereby reducing its value, and possibly thwarting the sale.

In 2009, the beneficiaries to the Vibrandsøy estate accepted the municipality's 15 million kr bid for the property. The municipality pledged to renovate the deteriorated buildings on the island. The Norwegian government, through the Norwegian Ministry of the Environment, gave a total of 7.5 million kr to support the purchase.

There were also earlier attempts to sell the area to the municipality. During the 1980s, the mayor attempted to purchase the island for NOK 10 million, but it was not accepted. An offer to sell the island for the same price in 1991 was rejected due to the municipality's weak economy at the time.

== Buildings and population ==
In the 2001 census, Statistics Norway bundled Vibrandsøy together with its nearby islands as circuit 0402 Vibrandsøy, with a population of 4. The 2009 population estimate set the island's population to 1.

The buildings are concentrated in the southernmost part of Vibrandsøy. Among the buildings are the industrial building "Møllerodden", and a number of seaside houses along the shoreline. North of the islands is Sørhaugøy, where the Tonjer lighthouse is situated.

== See also ==
- List of islands of Norway
