= Haugesund =

Town in Rogaland, Norway

- Town/City
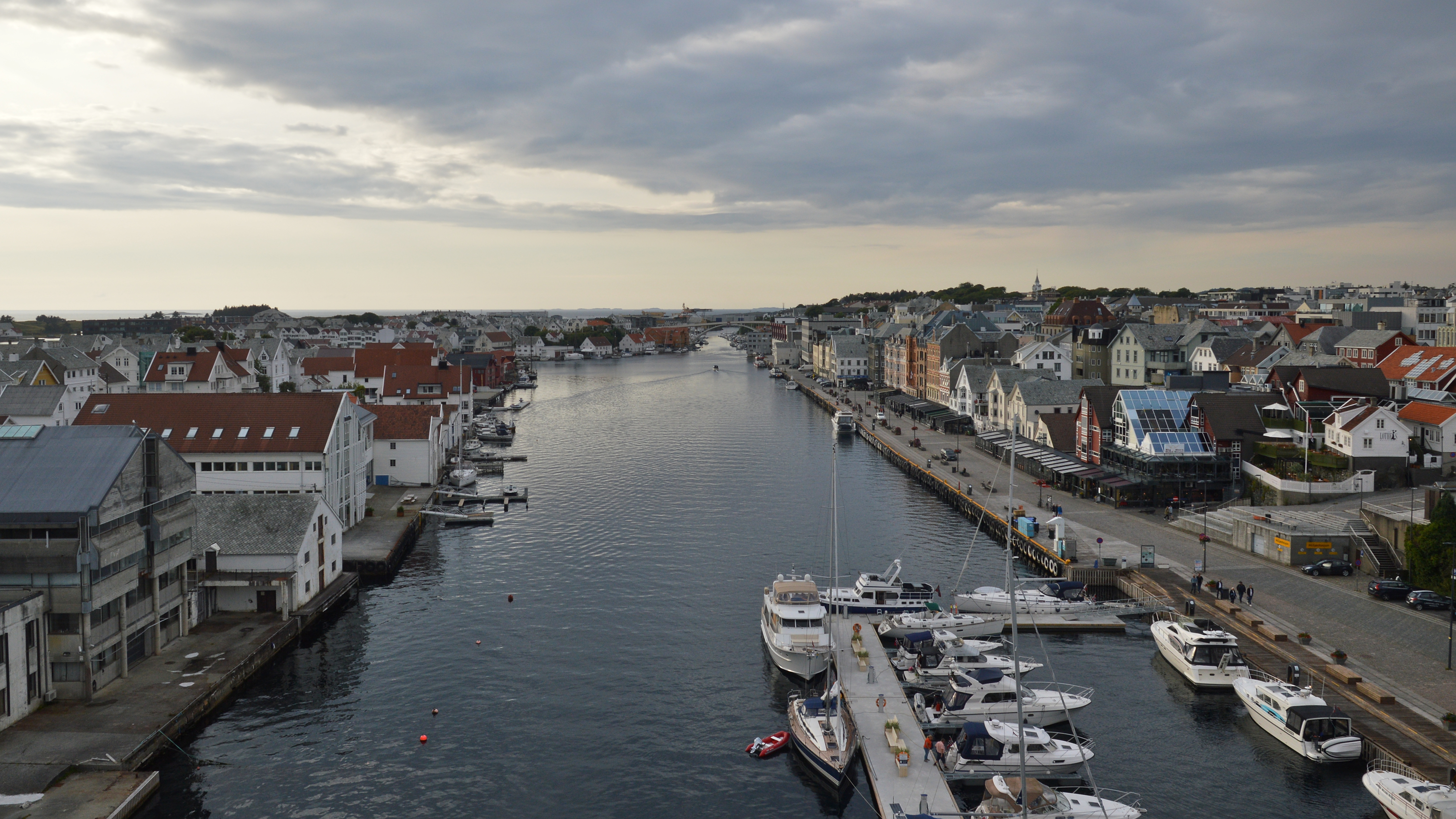
- View of Smedasundet and parts of central Haugesund
- Interactive map of Haugesund
- Coordinates: 59.41719°N 5.27288°E
- Country: Norway
- Region: Western Norway
- County: Rogaland
- District: Haugaland
- Municipality: Haugesund Municipality
- Established as
- Ladested: 1854
- Kjøpstad: 1866

Area
  - Total: 21.42 km^{2} (8.27 sq mi)
- Elevation: 22 m (72 ft)

Population (2025)
  - Total: 38 663
  - Density: 2,210/km^{2} (5,700/sq mi)
- Demonym(s): Haugesundar; Haugesunder
- Time zone: UTC+01:00 (CET)
  - Summer (DST): UTC+02:00 (CEST)
- Post Code: 5525 Haugesund

Haugesund ([ˈhæʉɡəsʉn]) is a town in Haugesund Municipality in Rogaland county, Norway. The town is located along the Karmsundet strait on the southwest coast of Norway. The town lies about 60 kilometres (37 mi) north of the city of Stavanger and about 120 kilometres (75 mi) south of the city of Bergen.

The 21.42-square-kilometre (5,290-acre) town has a population (2025) of 47,346 and a population density of 2,210 inhabitants per square kilometre (5,700/sq mi). The town of Haugesund dominates the landscape of the area. About 15.54 square kilometres (6.00 sq mi) of the municipality (about 21% of the municipality) is covered by the urban area of the town of Haugesund. The remaining area of the municipality (about 79% of the land area) is very rural. The portion of the municipality including the urban town of Haugesund has about 37,600 residents, while the rural portion of the municipality has about 1,000 residents. The town of Haugesund has grown to the south, so a portion of the urban town crosses over into Karmøy Municipality. The 5.88-square-kilometre (2.27 sq mi) area of the town located in Karmøy has about 9,700 residents.

== Location ==
The town is situated on the strategically important Karmsundet strait through which ships can pass without traversing heavy seas. In the early years, the coastal waters off Haugesund were a huge source of herring, and the town grew accordingly. Despite being barely a village back then, King Harald Fairhair lived at Avaldsnes, very close to the modern town of Haugesund. In the last decades, the town, like its neighbours, has been turning towards the petroleum industry, with the herring being long gone.

During the last 20 years, the town has established its position as the main trading centre for the Haugaland region and southern parts of Vestland county. It has several relatively large shopping centres, however, this has led to a decline of the trade and shopping activity in the town centre.

The Haugesund Region, a statistical metropolitan area, which consists of Karmøy Municipality, Haugesund Municipality, Tysvær Municipality, Sveio Municipality and Bokn Municipality, has a population of over 101,000 people (as of 2026).

== History ==
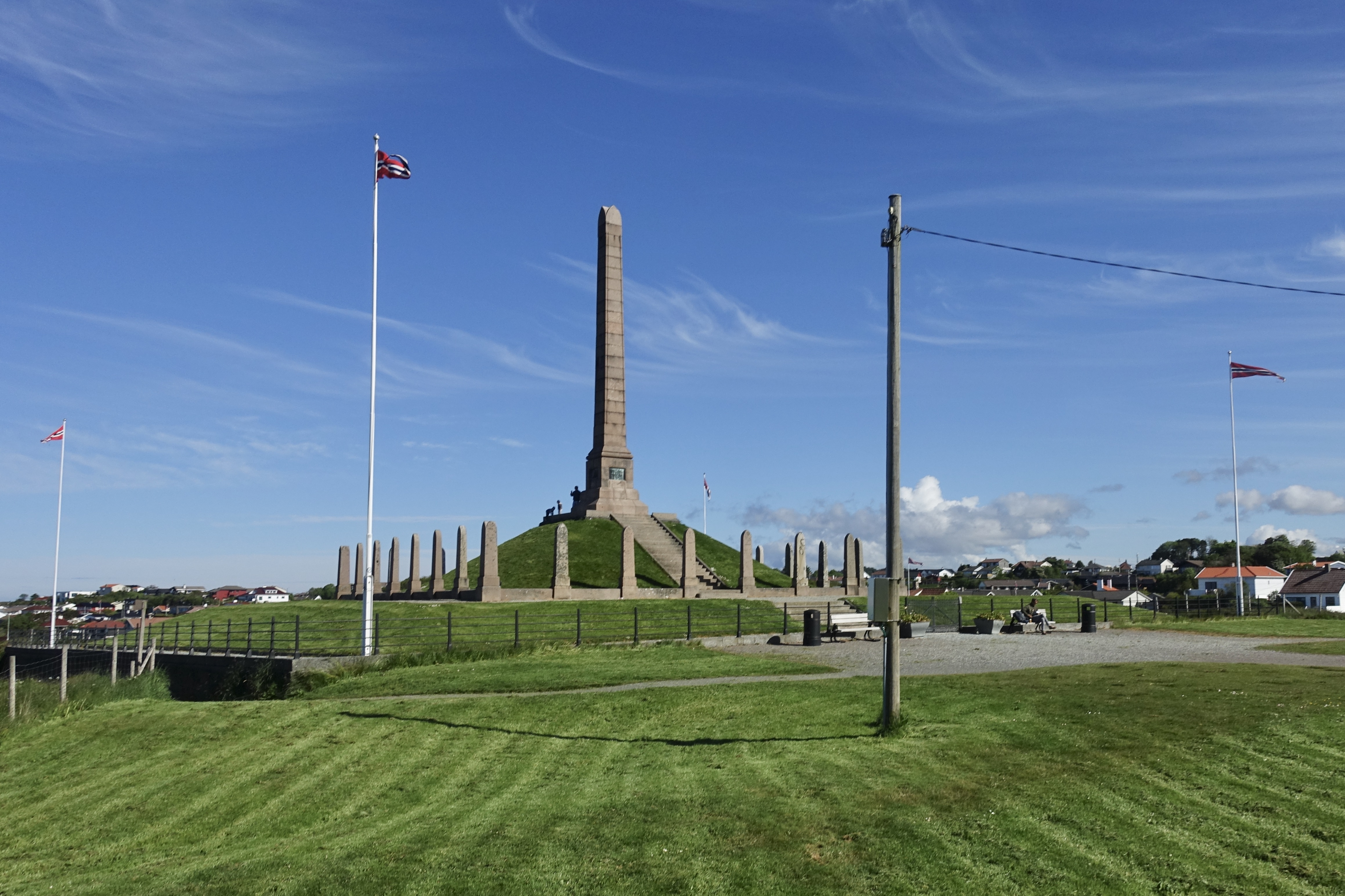
Haraldshaugen

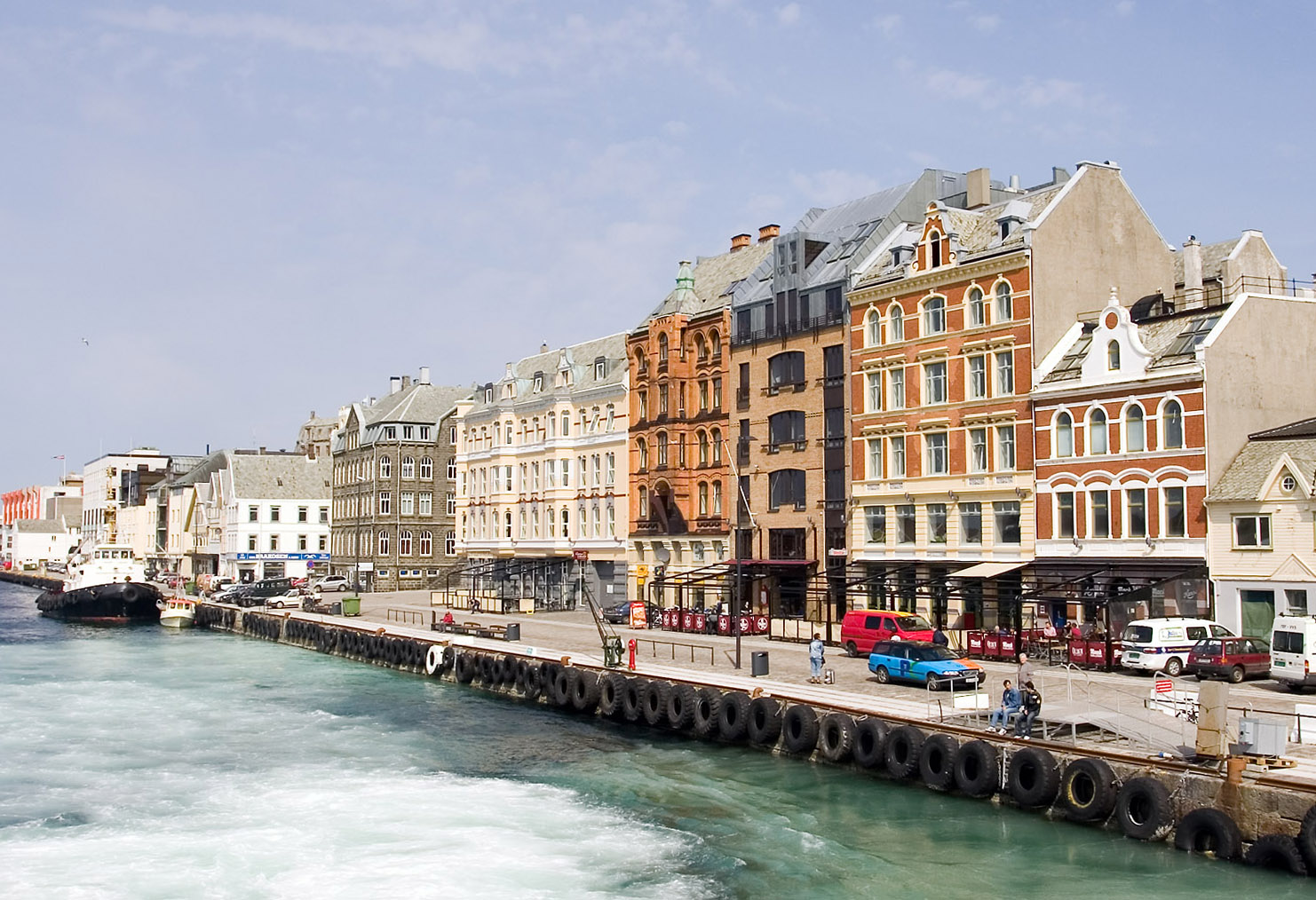
Part of central Haugesund

Despite being a fairly young town, the areas surrounding Haugesund were lands of power during the Viking Age. Harald Fairhair was the first king of Norway. He had his home in Avaldsnes, also known as Homeland of the Viking Kings, only 8 kilometres (5.0 mi) from the present town of Haugesund. After his death in c. 940, it is believed Fairhair was buried at Haraldshaugen, a burial mound adjacent to the Karmsundet strait. This site is the namesake of the town and municipality of Haugesund. The national monument at Haraldshaugen was raised in 1872, to commemorate the 1000th anniversary of the naval Battle of Hafrsfjord in 872. The Battle of Hafrsfjord has traditionally been regarded as when western Norway was unified under a single monarch for the first time.

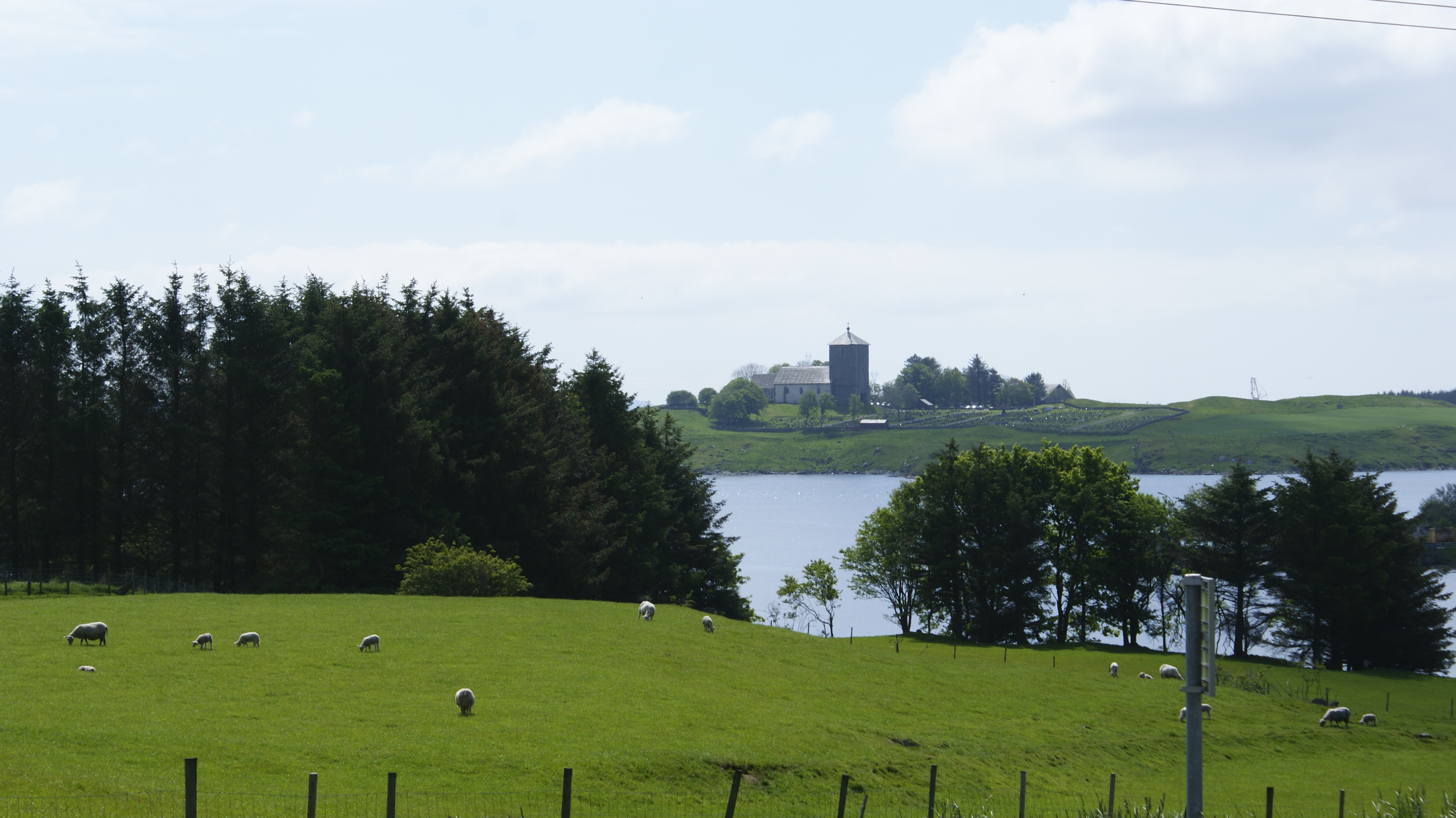
Karmøy pastures and St. Olav's church at Avaldsnes

Haugesund has a strong historical bond to the sea and especially the herring. In the earlier years, the coastal waters of Haugesund were a huge source for fishing herring, and the town grew accordingly. The protective straits of Smedasund and Karmsund gave the town potential to grow in both fishing and shipping. Even to this day, Karmsund is one of Norway's busiest waterways. The town is still growing geographically even though the population has increased only moderately over the last decade. In modern times the herring stocks have been depleted and the town is turning towards the petroleum industry, like its neighbouring town to the south, Stavanger.

The urban village area of Haugesund (population: 1,066) was declared to be a ladested in 1854. Due to this fact, the new town was separated from the surrounding Torvastad Municipality on 1 February 1855 to become a separate municipality. In 1866, Haugesund was designated as a kjøpstad, giving it full town status under the law. On 1 January 1911, the town was enlarged by annexing the small urban area of Skåre Municipality (population: 3,847) that directly abutted the town of Haugesund. On 1 January 1958, Skåre Municipality was merged with the town of Haugesund, creating a larger Haugesund Municipality. On 1 January 1965, the island of Vibrandsøya (population: 70) was transferred from Torvastad Municipality to Haugesund Municipality.

=== Etymology ===
The town (and the municipality) is named after the Haugesundet strait (Old Norse: Haugasund), which is named after the old Hauge farm (Old Norse: Haugar). The first element is the plural genitive case of haugr which means "hill" or "mound". The last element is sund which means "strait" or "sound".

== Geography and climate ==
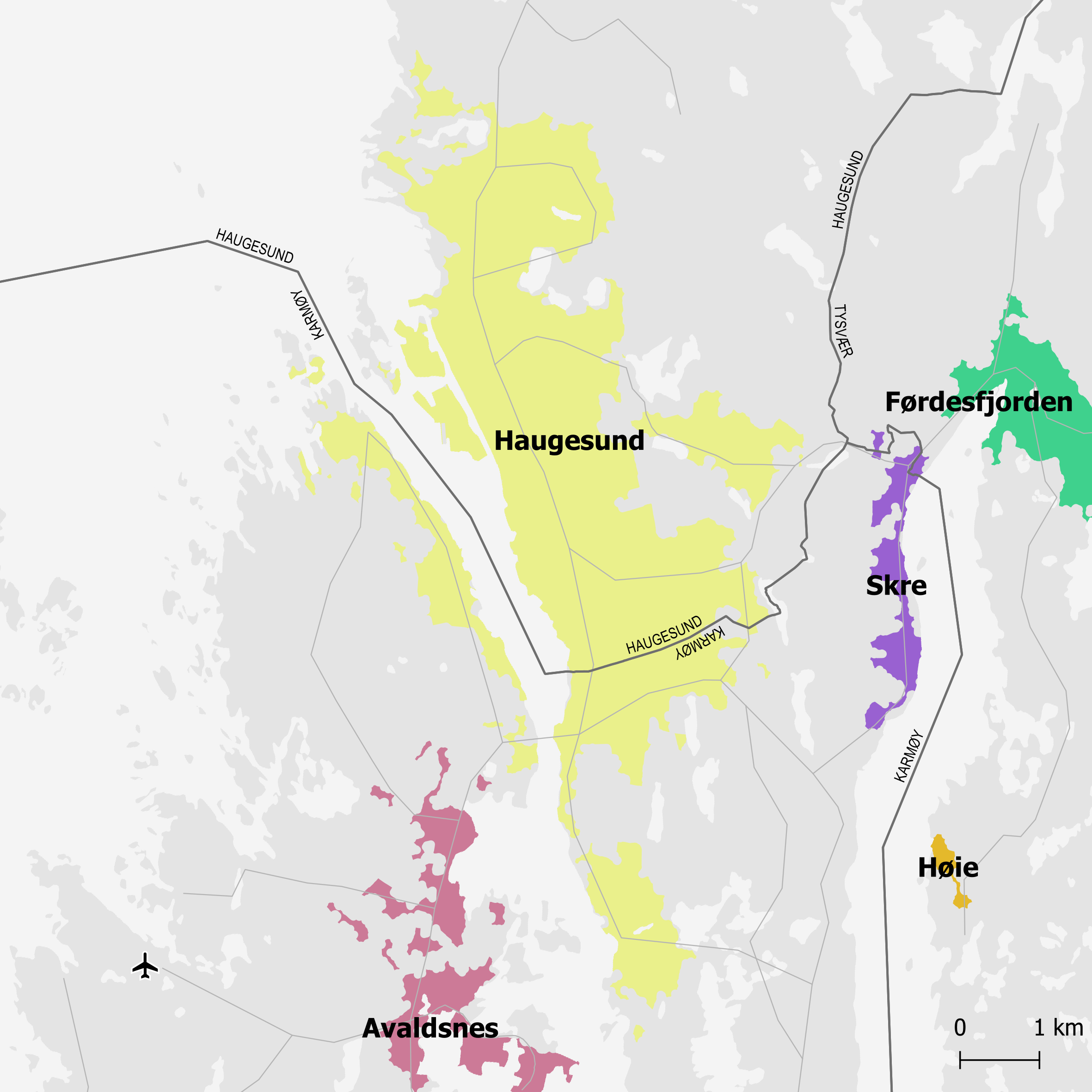
Urban area of the town of Haugesund (2020)

Haugesund is located along the North Sea coast, however, the island of Karmøy and the archipelago of Røvær shelter it from the rough waters of the ocean. The Karmsundet strait, located between Karmøy and Haugesund used to be very strategically important, since ships could pass without having to sail through heavy sea. There are several islands in the Karmsunet strait that are part of the town of Haugesund. The islands of Risøya and Hasseløya are densely built, and connected to the mainland of the town by bridges. Vibrandsøya and its neighboring islands are now mainly a recreational area. Haugesund's city centre has a distinctive street layout, similar to those found in Kristiansand and Oslo.

Haugesund has an oceanic climate (Cfb, marine west coast) with rainy winters and mild and pleasant summers. The all-time high 31.2 °C (88.2 °F) was recorded July 2019, and the all-time low −16.6 °C (2.1 °F) was set in January 2010 (extremes since 2003). The wettest time of year is autumn and winter, while April–July is the driest season. Haugesund Airport is situated in Karmøy municipality, about 8 kilometres (5.0 mi) from the town of Haugesund, and it has been recording weather data since 1975.

Climate data for Haugesund Airport Karmøy 1991-2020 (24 m, precipitation Haugesund-Rossabø, extremes 2003–2020)
Month	Jan	Feb	Mar	Apr	May	Jun	Jul	Aug	Sep	Oct	Nov	Dec	Year
Record high °C (°F)	10.2 (50.4)	11.5 (52.7)	16.9 (62.4)	20.8 (69.4)	30.8 (87.4)	29.4 (84.9)	31.2 (88.2)	29.6 (85.3)	29.3 (84.7)	20.2 (68.4)	15.9 (60.6)	11.6 (52.9)	31.2 (88.2)
Mean daily maximum °C (°F)	4 (39)	4 (39)	6 (43)	10 (50)	13 (55)	15 (59)	18 (64)	18 (64)	15 (59)	12 (54)	8 (46)	6 (43)	11 (51)
Daily mean °C (°F)	3 (37)	2.1 (35.8)	3.3 (37.9)	6.3 (43.3)	9.4 (48.9)	12 (54)	14.9 (58.8)	15.2 (59.4)	12.9 (55.2)	8.8 (47.8)	5.9 (42.6)	3.6 (38.5)	8.1 (46.6)
Mean daily minimum °C (°F)	1 (34)	0 (32)	1 (34)	4 (39)	7 (45)	10 (50)	13 (55)	13 (55)	11 (52)	7 (45)	4 (39)	2 (36)	6 (43)
Record low °C (°F)	−16.6 (2.1)	−13 (9)	−13.3 (8.1)	−5.9 (21.4)	−2.2 (28.0)	1.6 (34.9)	5.6 (42.1)	4.9 (40.8)	1.1 (34.0)	−3.4 (25.9)	−11.4 (11.5)	−14.9 (5.2)	−16.6 (2.1)
Average precipitation mm (inches)	160 (6.3)	133 (5.2)	123 (4.8)	86 (3.4)	76 (3.0)	85 (3.3)	97 (3.8)	143 (5.6)	172 (6.8)	197 (7.8)	199 (7.8)	192 (7.6)	1,663 (65.4)
Source 1: yr.no/met.no/eklima
Source 2: Weatheronline (avg highs/lows 1996-2020)

== Cityscape ==
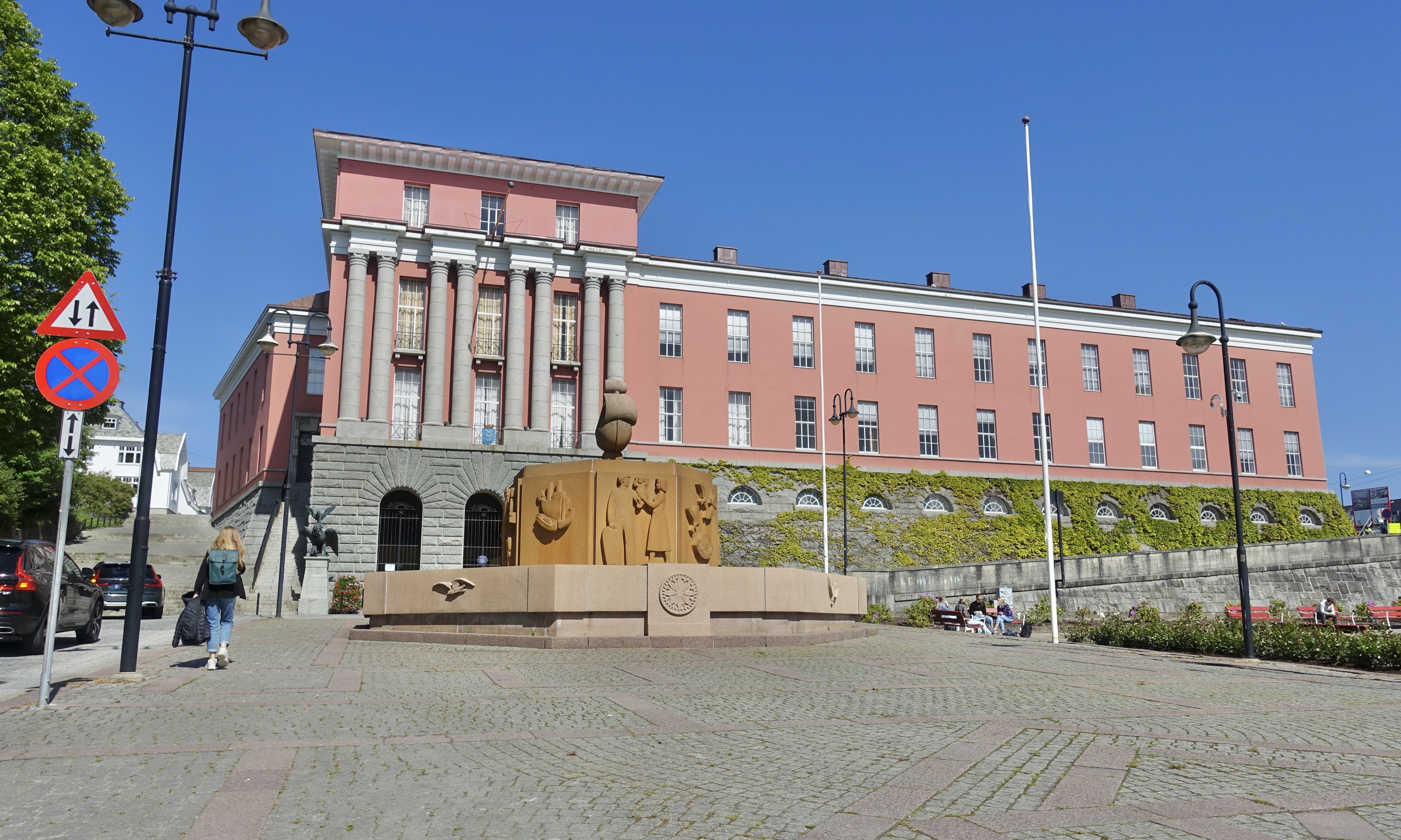
The city hall, designed by Gudolf Blakstad and Herman Munthe-Kaas

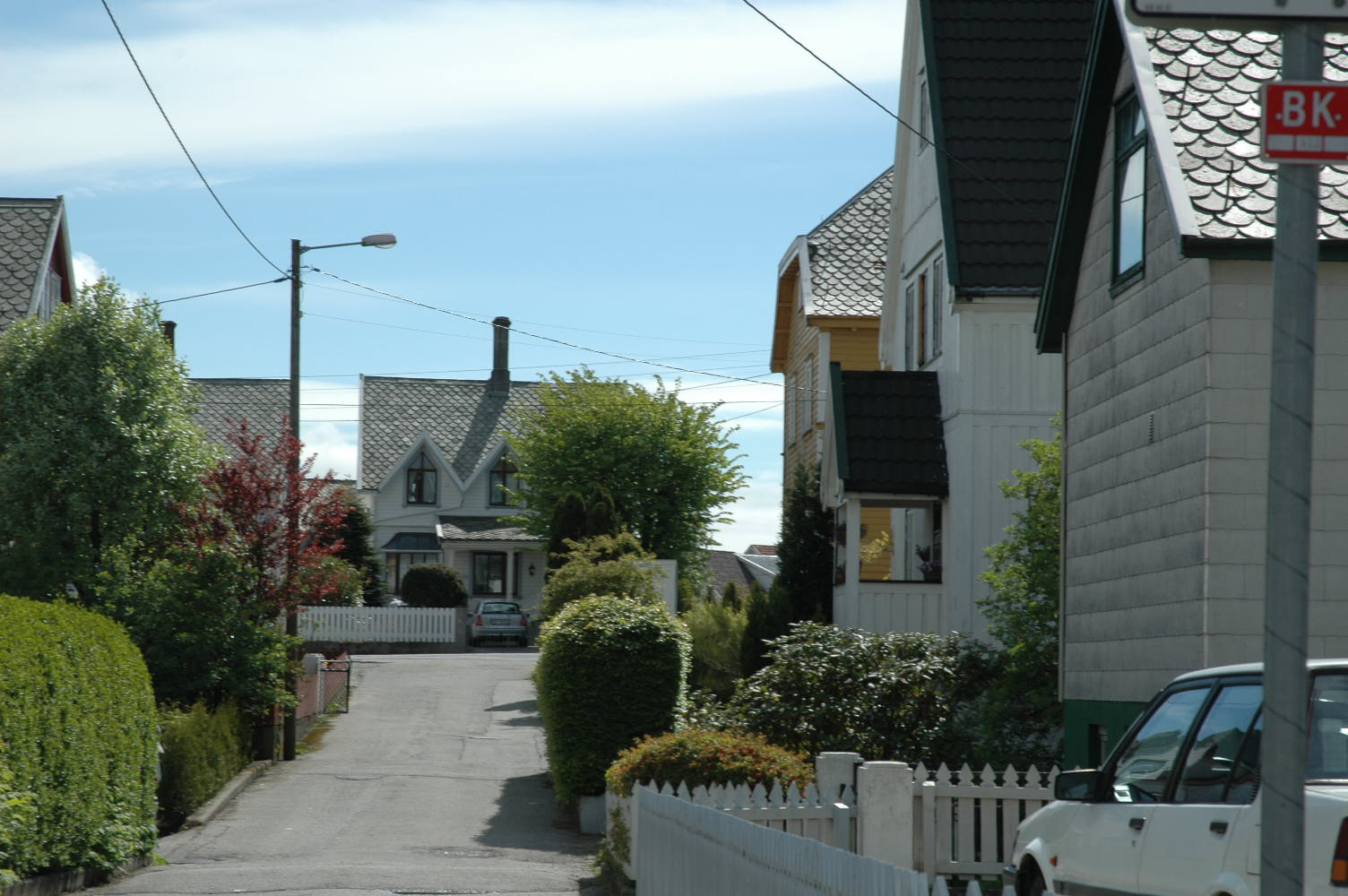
Common street in Haugesund

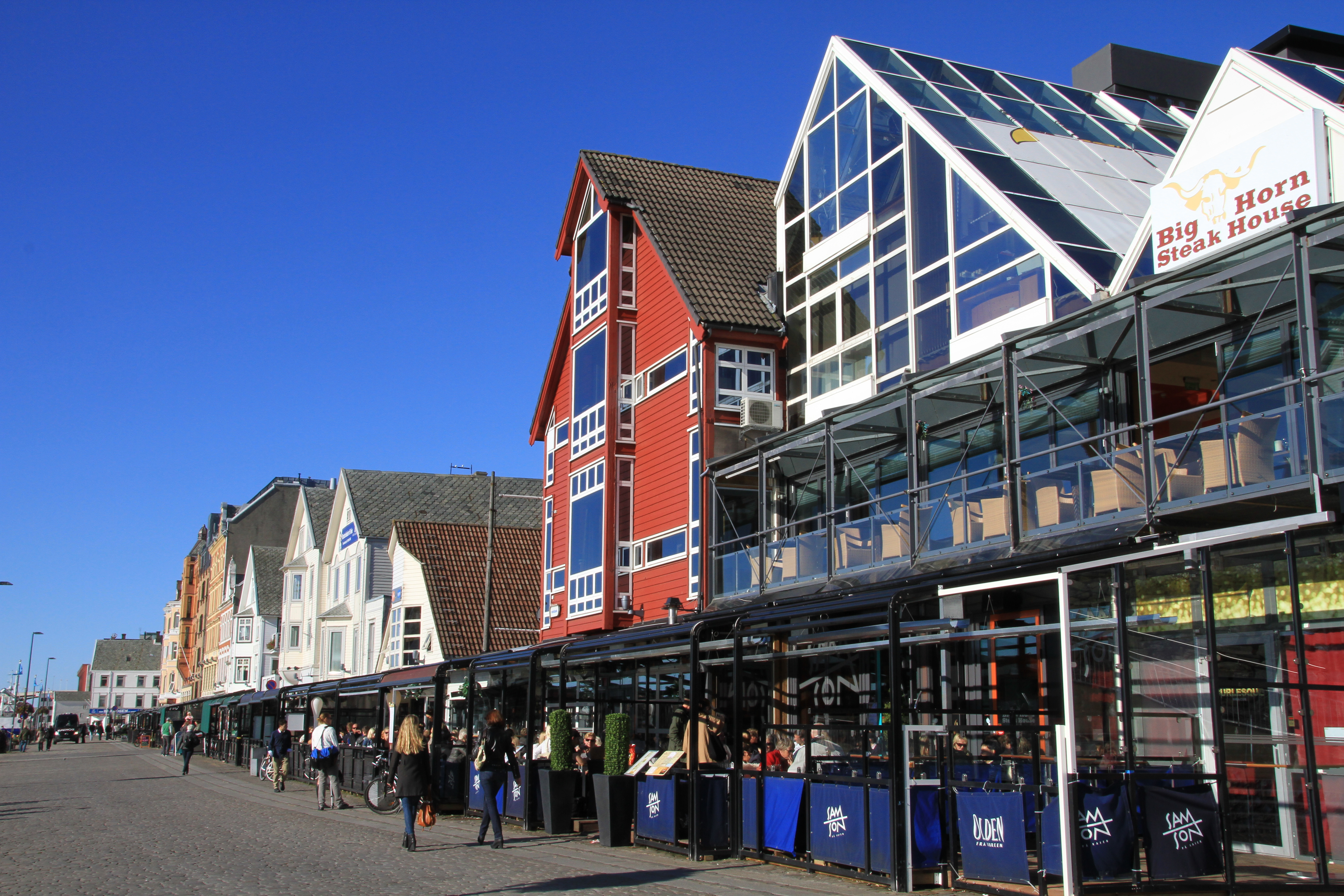
Haugesund harbour

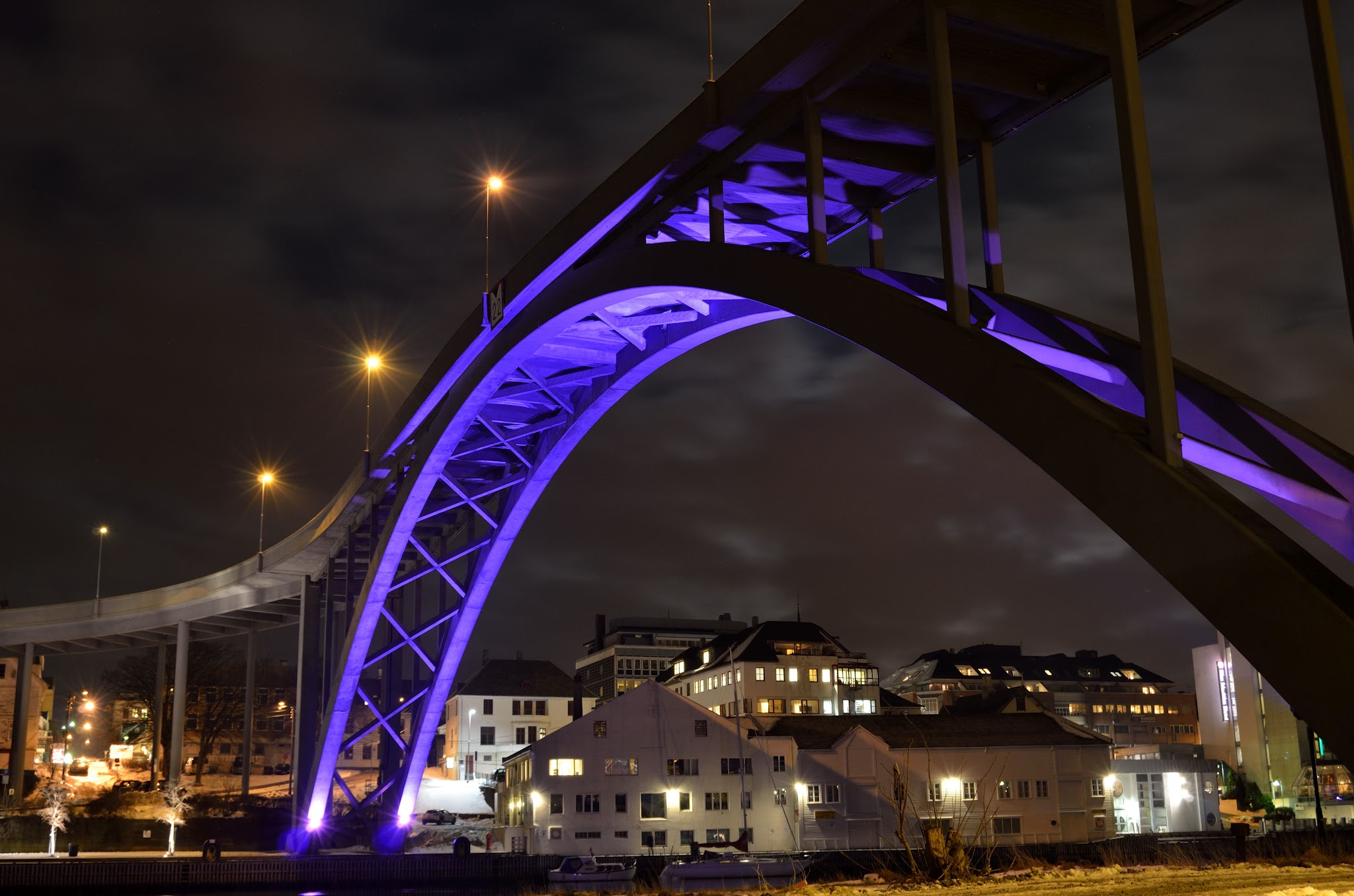
Risøybrua seen from Risøy

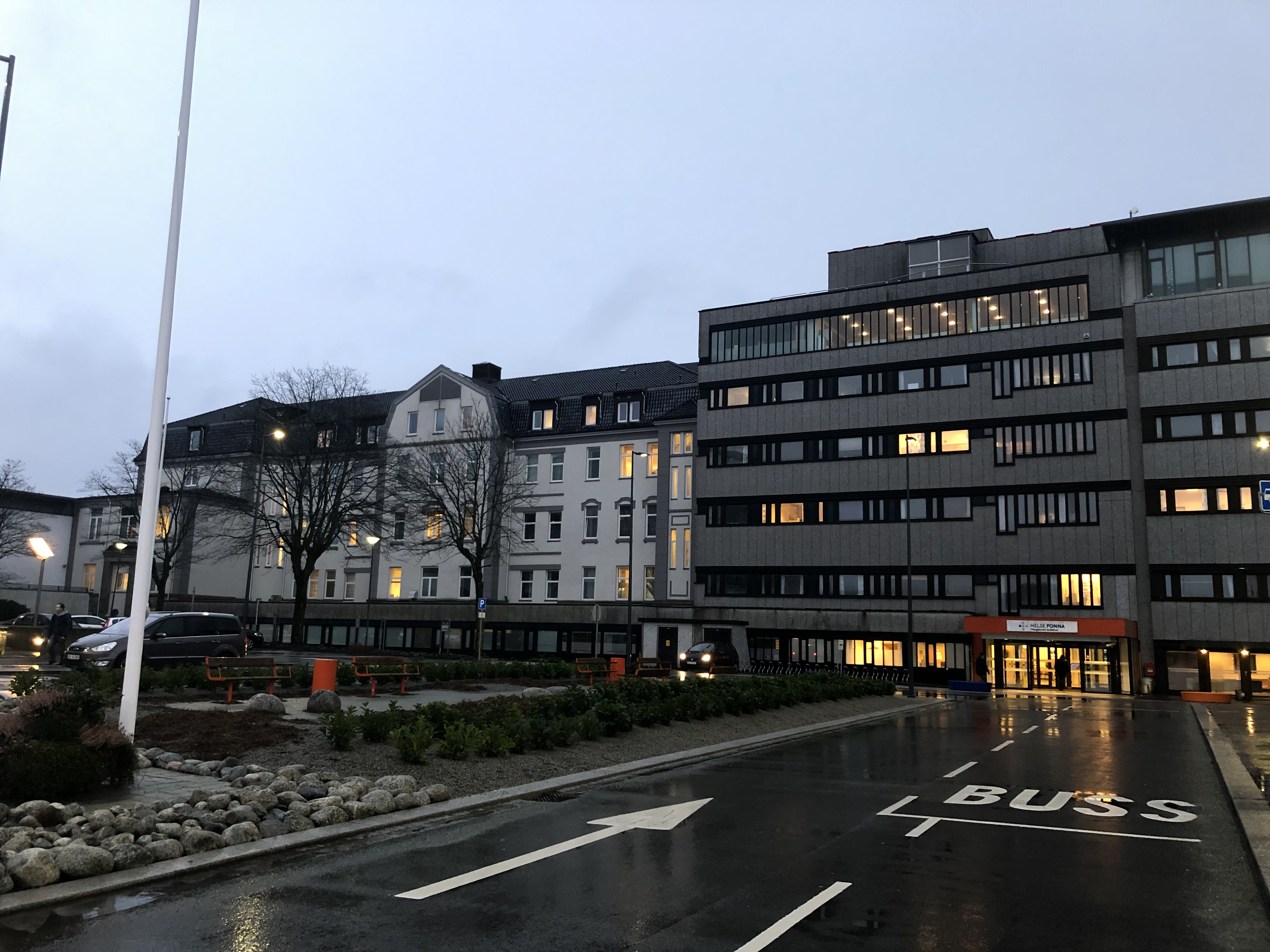
Haugesund hospital

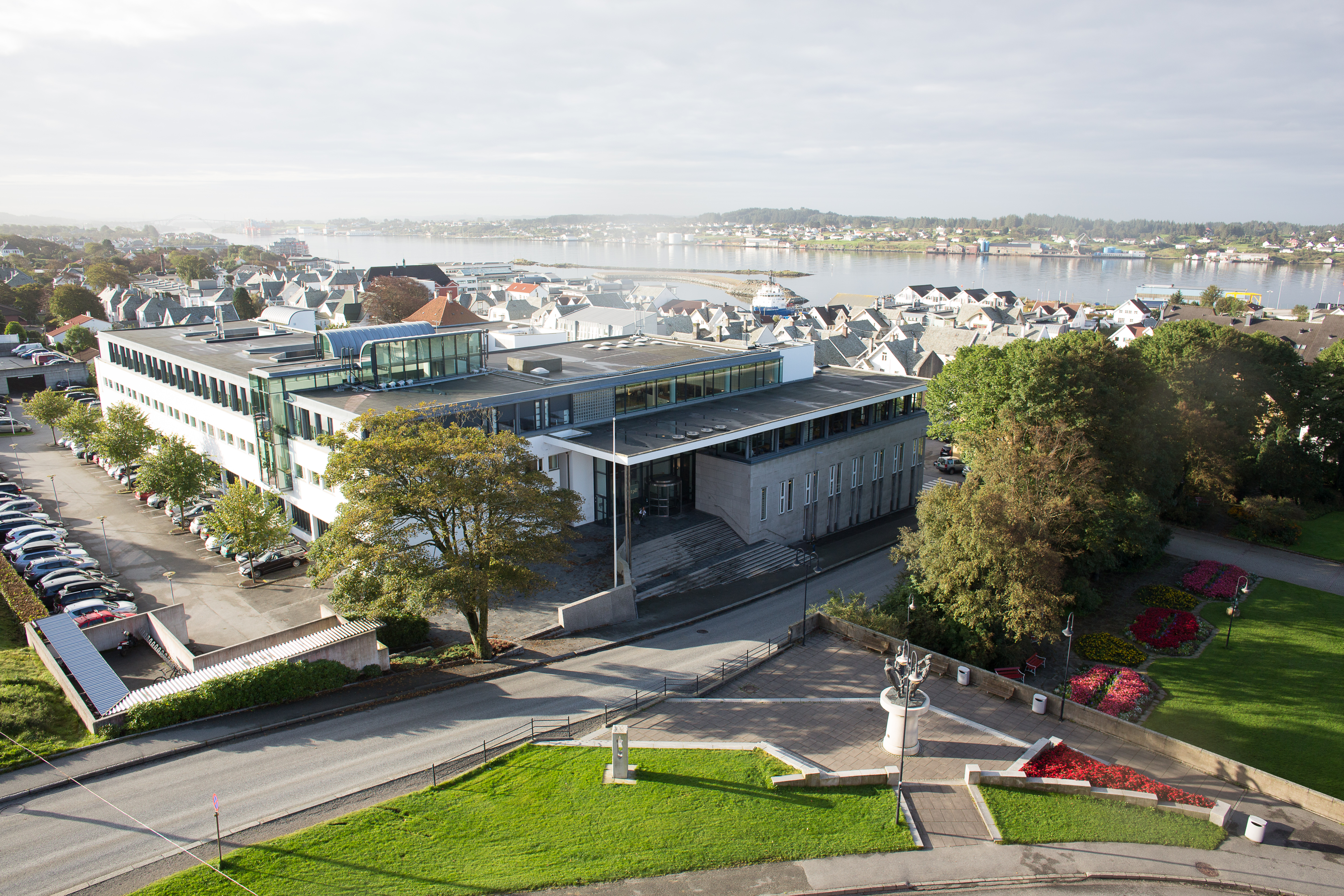
Campus Haugesund

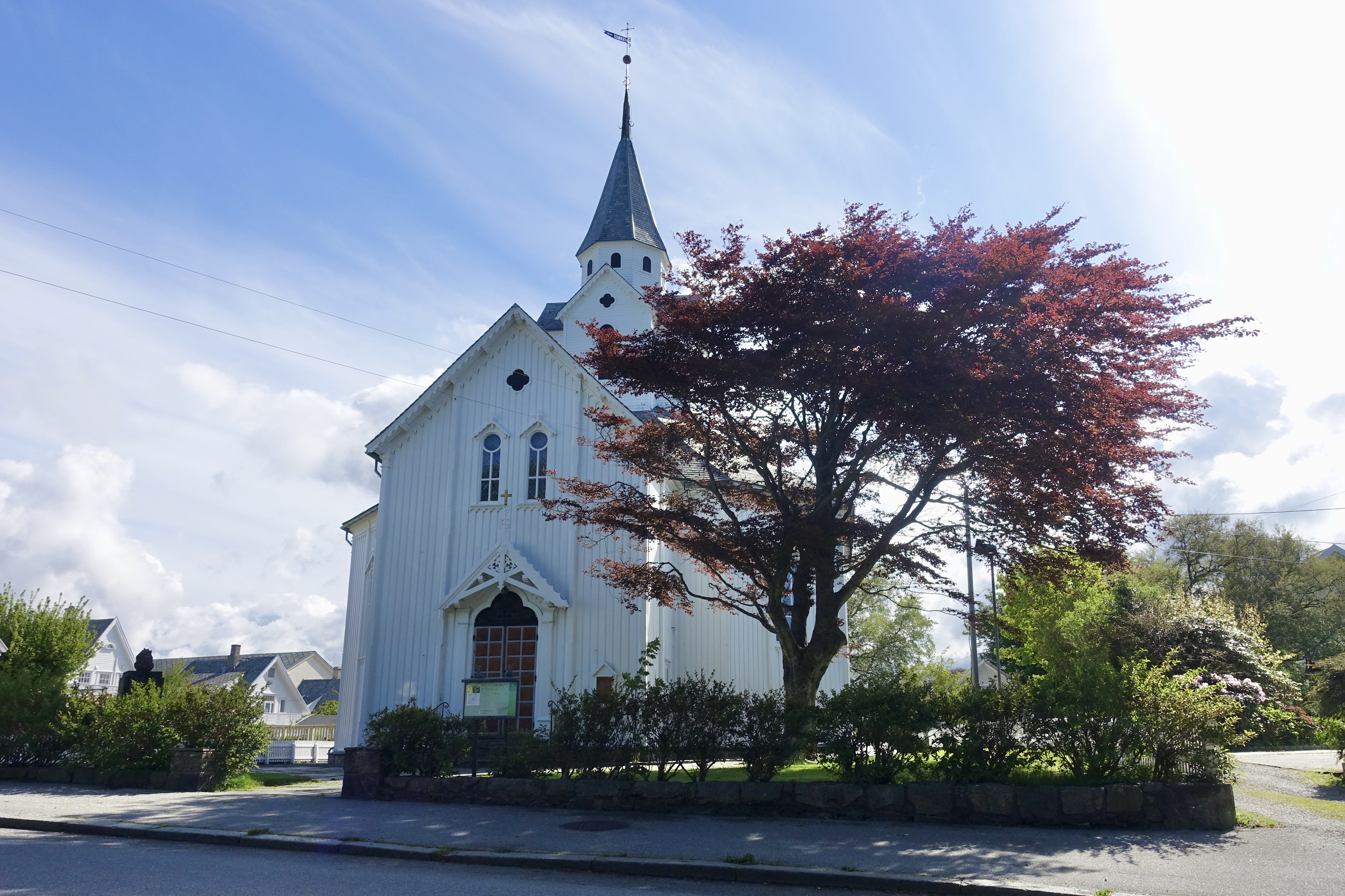
Skåre Church

Haugesund City Hall was built in 1931, celebrating its 75th anniversary in 2006. The pink city hall, designed by Gudolf Blakstad and Herman Munthe-Kaas, is one of the finest neo-classical buildings in Norway, and has been elected the most beautiful building in Haugesund. It is also included in the new Norwegian edition of the game Monopoly after it was successful in a national vote. The building may not be altered in any way without permission from the national preservation agency. It overlooks the town square and a park which was inaugurated on 28 August 1949.

During the last 20 years, the town has established its position as the main trading centre for the Haugaland region and southern parts of Vestland county. It has several relatively large shopping centres, however, this has led to a decline of the trade and shopping activity in the town centre.

There are several churches in the town of Haugesund including Vår Frelsers Church, Udland Church, Rossabø Church, and Skåre Church.

== Transport ==
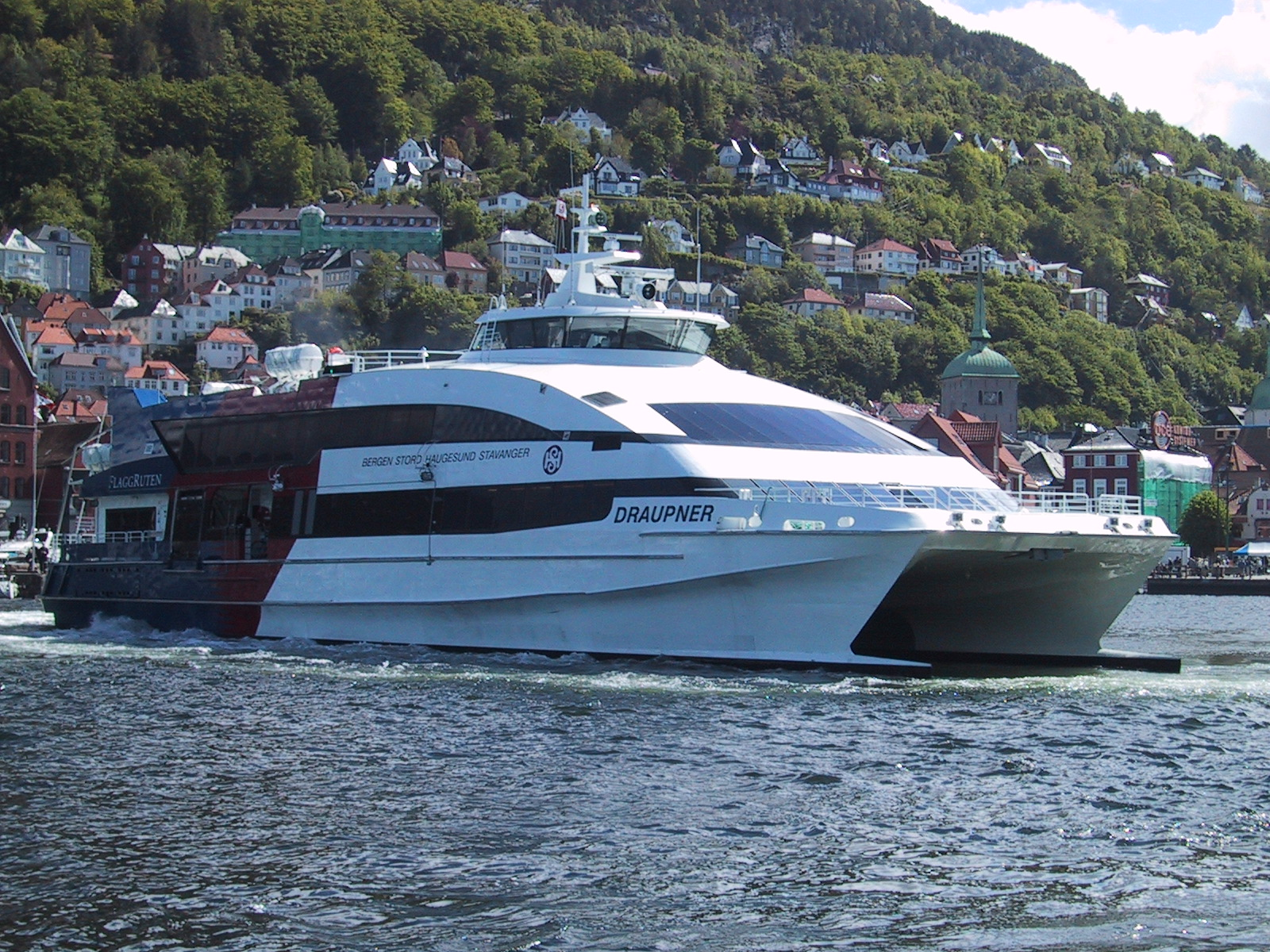
MS Draupner, one of the catamaran ferries on the former route Bergen – Haugesund – Stavanger

Haugesund Airport, located on the island of Karmøy to the southwest of Haugesund in Karmøy Municipality, has year-round flights to Oslo and Gdańsk in addition to some seasonal and charter destinations. The Norwegian airline Coast Air was based at Haugesund airport, but filed for bankruptcy on 23 January 2008.

The European Route E39 bypasses Haugesund to the east, passing through Aksdal. The European Route E134 leads eastwards to Drammen outside Oslo.

The bus station in Haugesund is located at Flotmyr on the east side of the downtown area. Long-distance bus services are available to Stavanger, Bergen, and Oslo. The local bus transport is operated by Vy Buss, on a contract with Kolumbus.

The town is connected to the island of Utsira by car ferry, and to the islands of Røvær and Feøy by passenger ferry. Until 2008, the Newcastle–Bergen–Stavanger ferry operated here as well.

== Healthcare ==
Haugesund Hospital provides specialist health services to around 180,000 inhabitants in northern Rogaland, Sunnhordland, Hardanger, and Ryfylke. The hospital offers services in both medicine and surgery, radiology/X-ray, childbirth/maternity, gynecology and fertility, rehabilitation, and specialized treatment in mental health care. There are also more than 10 public and private health centers in the town for either general or specialized care, including the Privatsykehuset Haugesund.

== Culture ==
Haugesund is the main cultural centre for its region, and is home to several festivals, the largest being the Norwegian International Film Festival and Sildajazz, an international jazz festival with approximately 70 bands and close to 200 concerts. Every August, The Norwegian Trad-jazz festival, the Sildajazz is held. Both local and international musicians are presented at the Sildajazz.

In the summer of 2004, the annual rock festival, "RockFest" started. It attracted local, national and international pop and rock bands, such as Elton John, Madcon, DumDum Boys and Kaizers Orchestra. The festival started as a part of the celebration of Haugesund's 150 year anniversary. In 2009, the last Rockfest was held, and got replaced by a new concept in 2010; Haugesund Live. Haugesund Live is a series of individual concerts, and has featured bands such as the Baseballs, Kim Larsen and Mötley Crüe.

The Norwegian International Film Festival has since 1973 been held in Haugesund, premiering and showing international and Norwegian films. The Amanda Award, Norway's variation of the Oscars, has been held in Haugesund since 1985 in concurrence with the film festival.

Haugesunds Avis is a daily newspaper published in Haugesund, but with branches in Bømlo, Kopervik, Odda, Sauda and Stord. Founded in 1895, it is today owned by the investment group Mecom Group, and is as such part of the media group Edda Media. In 2006, Haugesunds Avis had a circulation of 33,448. The newspaper owns the local radio channel Radio 102.

== Sports ==
=== Football (soccer) ===
The strongest local football team is FK Haugesund that plays in the Norwegian First Division. They played in the Eliteserien (known as the Tippeligaen until 2016) from 2010 to 2025. The team plays its home matches at Haugesund Stadion.

Other local football teams are Vard Haugesund, Djerv 1919 and SK Haugar.

=== Other sports ===
- Haugesund IL, athletics.
- Haugesund Seagulls, ice hockey
- Haugesund Turnforening, gymnastics

== Notable people ==
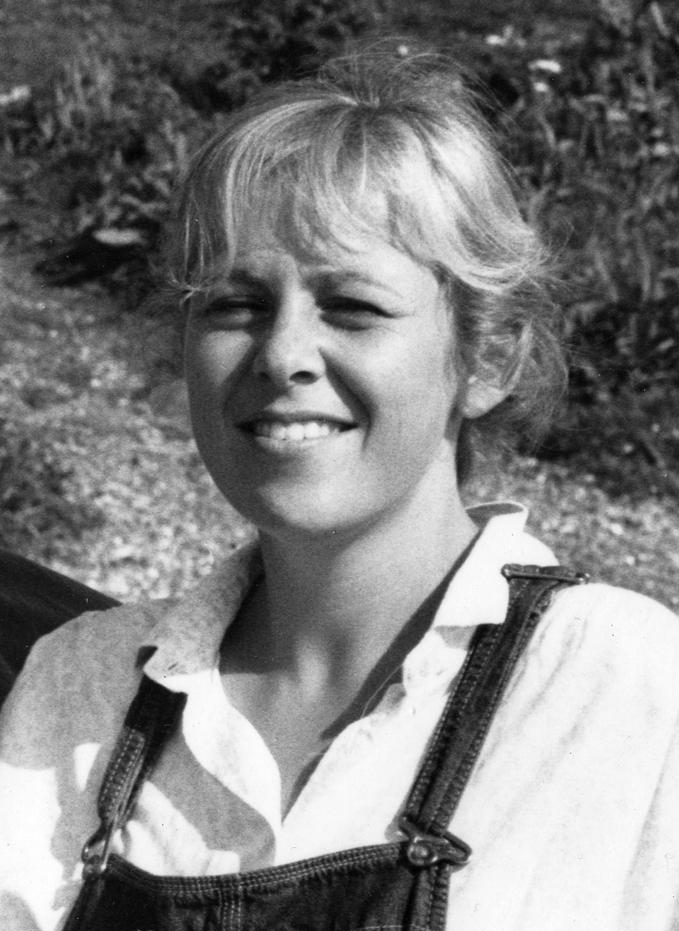
Turid Birkeland, 1985

- Hanna Brummenæs (1860-1942), a pioneering female shipping company owner and City Councillor
- Eivind Nielsen (1864–1939), a painter and illustrator of children's books
- Egil Eide (1868–1946), a silent film actor and director
- Henrik Børseth (1885–1970), an actor
- Ellen Sinding (1899–1980), an actress and dancer
- Tollak B. Sirnes (1922–2009), a physician, psychiatrist, and pharmacologist
- Olle Johan Eriksen (1923–1999), a politician who was mayor of Haugesund Municipality in the 1970s
- Odd Langholm (born 1928), an economist and historian of economic thought
- Jacob Stolt-Nielsen (1931–2015), an entrepreneur who founded Stolt-Nielsen, a parcel tanker firm
- Hanne Krogh (born 1956), a singer and actress, won the Eurovision Song Contest 1985
- Jon Fosse (born 1959), an author and dramatist awarded in 2023 with the Nobel prize in Literature
- Turid Birkeland (1962–2015), a cultural executive and former politician
- Steffen Kverneland (born 1963), an illustrator and comics writer
- Kjetil Steensnæs (born 1976), a jazz musician who plays guitar, dobro, and banjo
- Captain Frodo (born 1976), a Guinness World Record breaking contortionist who lives in Australia
- Gunhild Stordalen (born 1979), a physician and environmental advocate
- Susanne Sundfør (born 1986), a singer-songwriter and record producer

=== US emigrants ===
- Gunvald Aus (1851–1950), an engineer who built the Woolworth Building in New York City
- Hannah Kallem (1865-1937), an American Army nurse who served in the Spanish–American War
- Martin Edward Mortensen (1897–1981), the son of an emigrant from the village of Skjold near Haugesund, was listed as father on the birth certificate of Marilyn Monroe. A statue of Monroe by Nils Aas stands on the seafront promenade in Haugesund town centre
- Sigmund R. Petersen (born ca.1940), a rear admiral and fourth Director of the NOAA Commissioned Officer Corps, who emigrated in 1948 to the USA

=== Sport ===
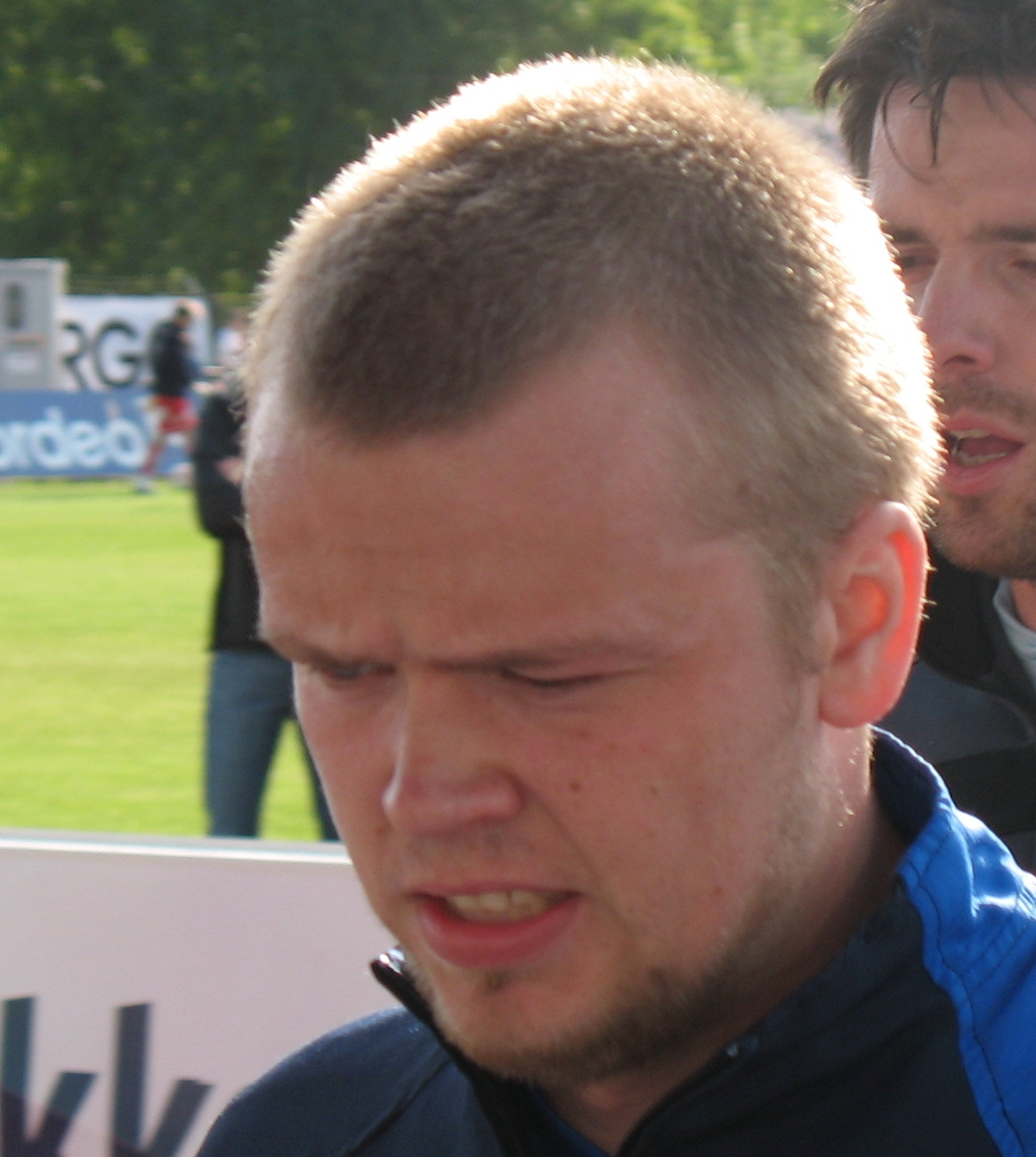
Christian Grindheim, 2006

- Stig Traavik (born 1967), a former judoka at 1992 Summer Olympics and diplomat.
- Egil Østenstad (born 1972), a former footballer with 334 club caps and 18 for Norway
- Trygve Nygaard (born 1975), a retired footballer with over 300 club caps
- Kenneth Høie (born 1979), a former football goalkeeper with 330 club caps
- Svein Oddvar Moen (born 1979), a Norwegian football referee
- Susanne Wigene (born 1978), a middle and long-distance runner
- Christian Grindheim (born 1983), a retired footballer with 530 club caps and 54 for Norway
- Tor Arne Andreassen (born 1983), former footballer, played 334 games with FK Haugesund
- Alexander Søderlund (born 1987), a footballer with over 300 club caps and 32 for Norway
- Sven Erik Bystrøm (born 1992), a Norwegian road bicycle racer
- Tommy Langaker (born 1994), a Brazilian Jiu Jitsu athlete, first Norwegian Black Belt World Champion under IBJJF

== See also ==
- List of towns and cities in Norway
