= Risøya =

Island in Haugesund, Norway

Risøya Risøy
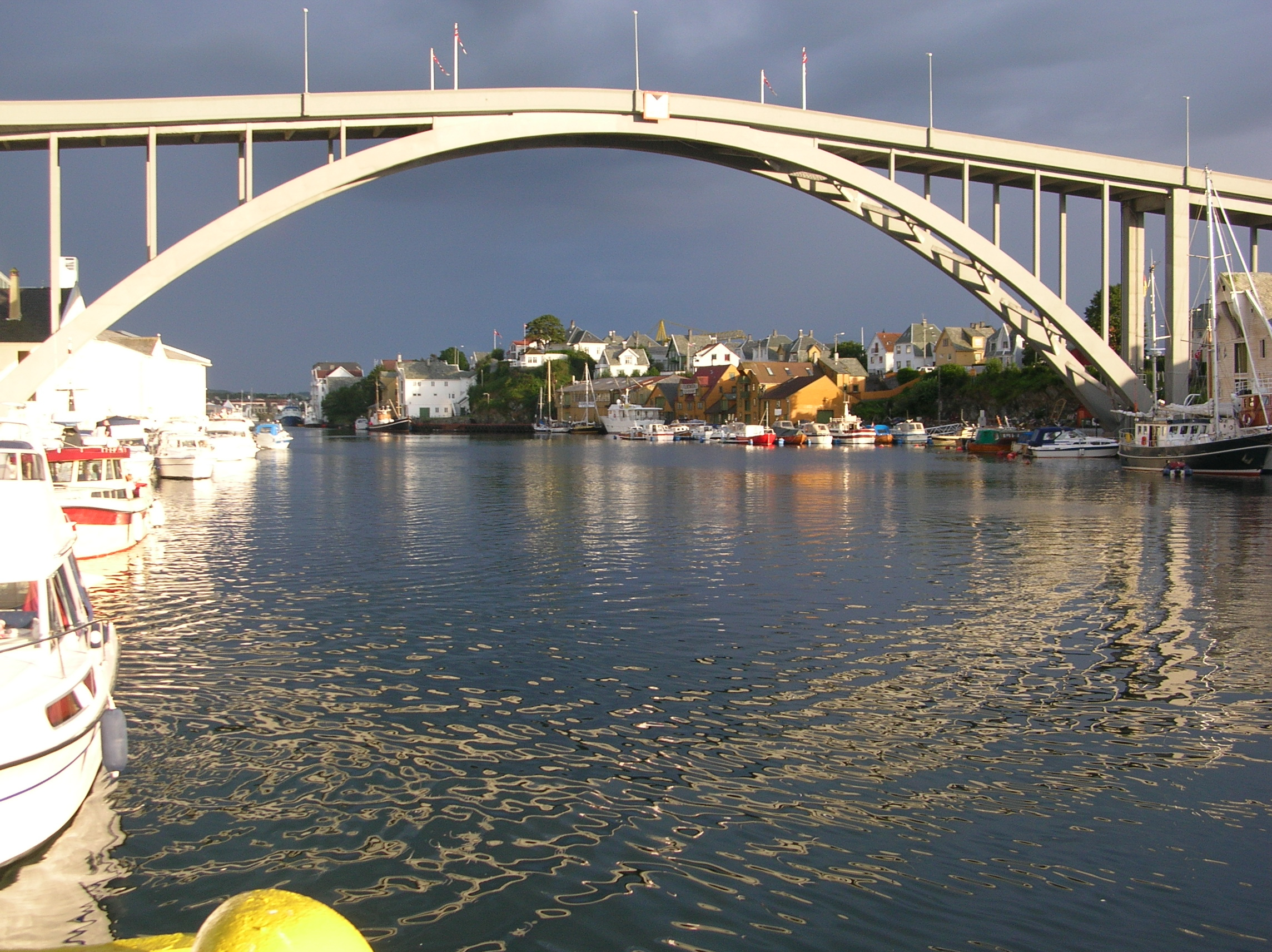
- View of the island, looking under the bridge
- Interactive map of the island

Geography
- Location: Rogaland, Norway
- Coordinates: 59.41021°N 5.26405°E
- Area: 0.23 km^{2} (0.089 sq mi)
- Length: 1.2 km (0.75 mi)
- Width: 400 m (1300 ft)

Administration
- Norway
- County: Rogaland
- Municipality: Haugesund Municipality

Demographics
- Population: 572 (2020)

Risøya (or Risøy) is an island in Haugesund Municipality in Rogaland county, Norway. The 0.23-square-kilometre (57-acre) island lies in the Karmsundet strait immediately south of the island of Hasseløya and southeast of the island of Vibrandsøya. Risøya is part of the town of Haugesund. The west side of the island is dominated by the docks, workshops, and industrial hall belonging to Aibel. Other offshore corporations also have offices on the southeast part of the island. The ferry to the island of Utsira operates from the Garpaskjær dock on the north shore of the island.

== History ==
While the neighboring island of Hasseløya to the north received its bridge to the mainland in 1872, Risøya was only connected to the mainline by ferry for many years. One of the local ferrymen, Ola Flytt, has been honored with a statue and a street name on the island. Industrial development of the island began in earnest during the 1930s. At this time, Risøya was densely populated, with approximately 3,000 residents. The development included the deepwater dock at Garpaskjær that could accommodate large ships. The road bridge from the mainland to the island was completed in 1939. Residential housing still makes up much of the east side of the island. In 2020, the island had a population of 572.

== See also ==
- List of islands of Norway
