= Vår Frelsers Church (Rogaland) =

Church in Rogaland, Norway

- Vår Frelsers kirke
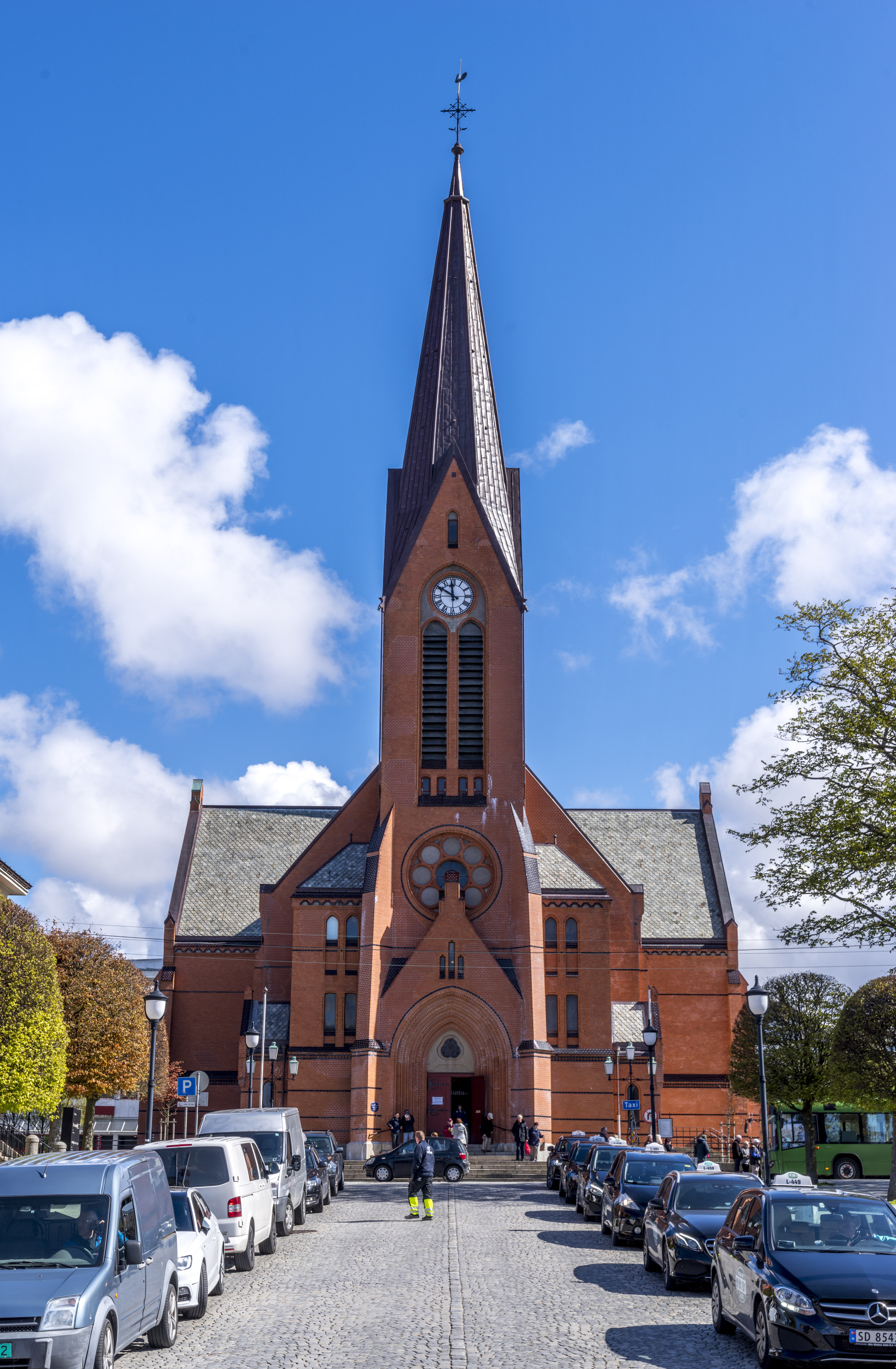
- View of the church
- Vår Frelsers Church
- 59.414481°N 5.270134°E
- Location: Haugesund Municipality, Rogaland
- Country: Norway
- Denomination: Church of Norway
- Churchmanship: Evangelical Lutheran

History
- Status: Parish church
- Founded: 1901
- Consecrated: 6 Mar 1902

Architecture
- Functional status: Active
- Architect: Einar Halleland
- Architectural type: Cruciform
- Style: Neo-gothic
- Groundbreaking: 1899
- Completed: 1901 (125 years ago)

Specifications
- Capacity: 850
- Materials: Brick

Administration
- Diocese: Stavanger bispedømme
- Deanery: Haugaland prosti
- Parish: Vår Frelser
- Norwegian Cultural Heritage Site
- Type: Church
- Status: Protected
- ID: 85887

Vår Frelsers Church (lit. 'Our Savior's Church'; Norwegian: Vår Frelsers kirke) is a parish church of the Church of Norway in Haugesund Municipality in Rogaland county, Norway. It is located in the centre of the town of Haugesund. It is the church for the Vår Frelser parish which is part of the Haugaland prosti (deanery) in the Diocese of Stavanger. The large, red brick church was built in a cruciform design with a Neo-gothic style in 1901 using designs by the architect Einar Halleland. The church seats about 850 people.

== History ==
Historically, the people of this area attended church at the nearby Skåre Church. In 1854, Haugesund was established as a ladested. As the small town grew, the residents began to ask for their own church in the town centre. In 1885, a plot of land was purchased and then in 1890, the government gave approval for a church to be built on the site. An architectural competition was held and the winner was Einar Halleland in February 1899. The church was built in 1899–1901 with consecration on 6 March 1902.

== Media gallery ==
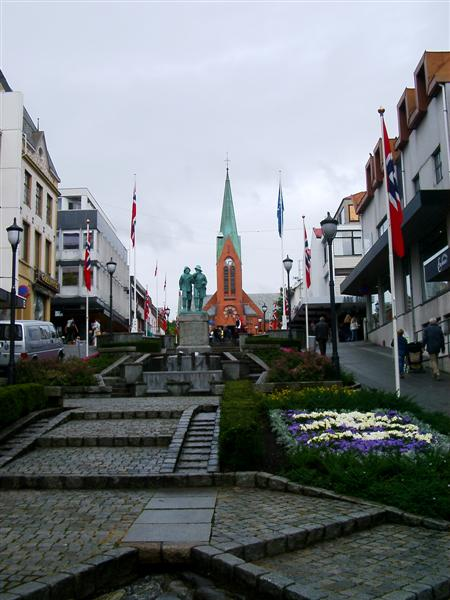

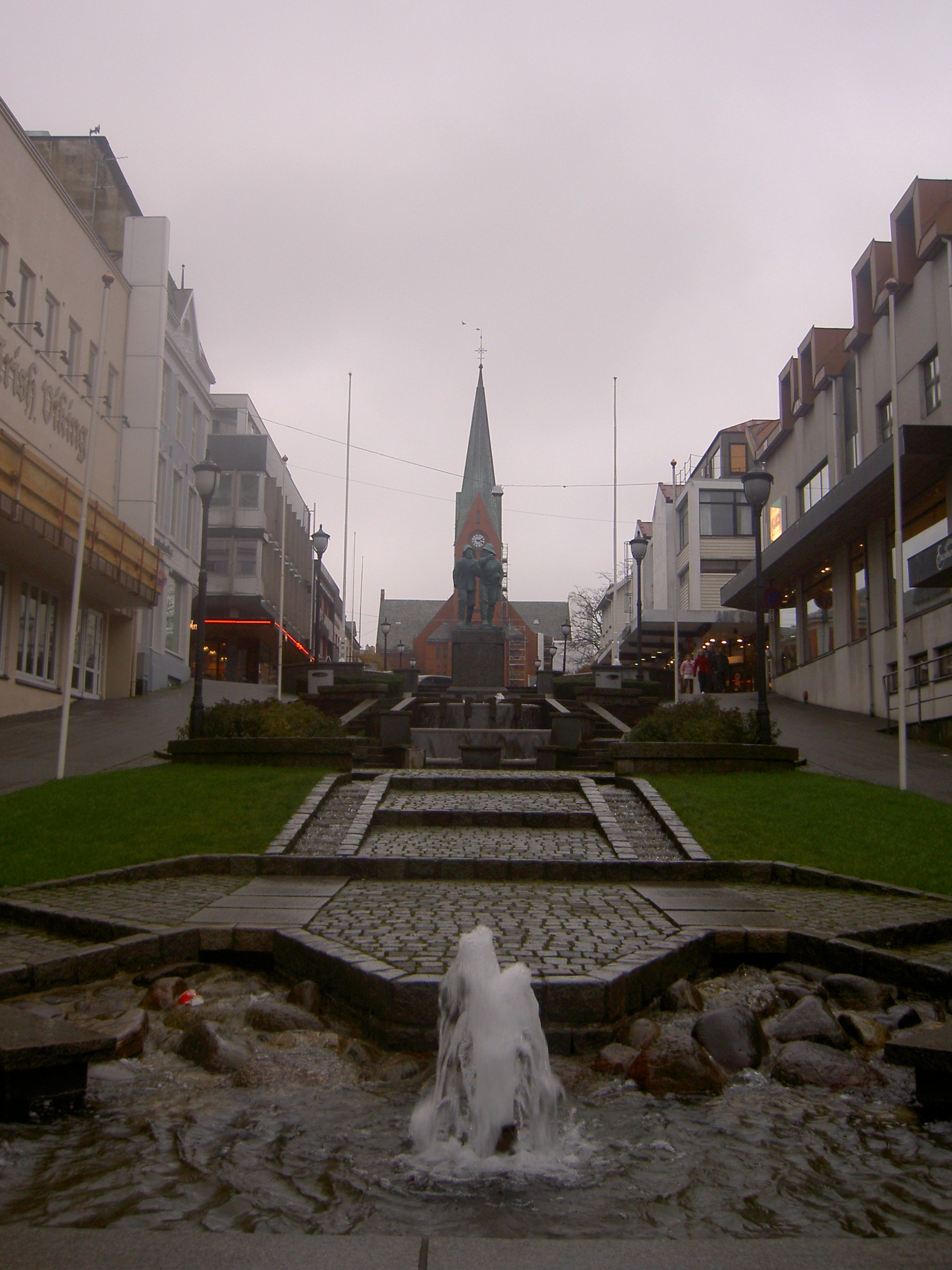

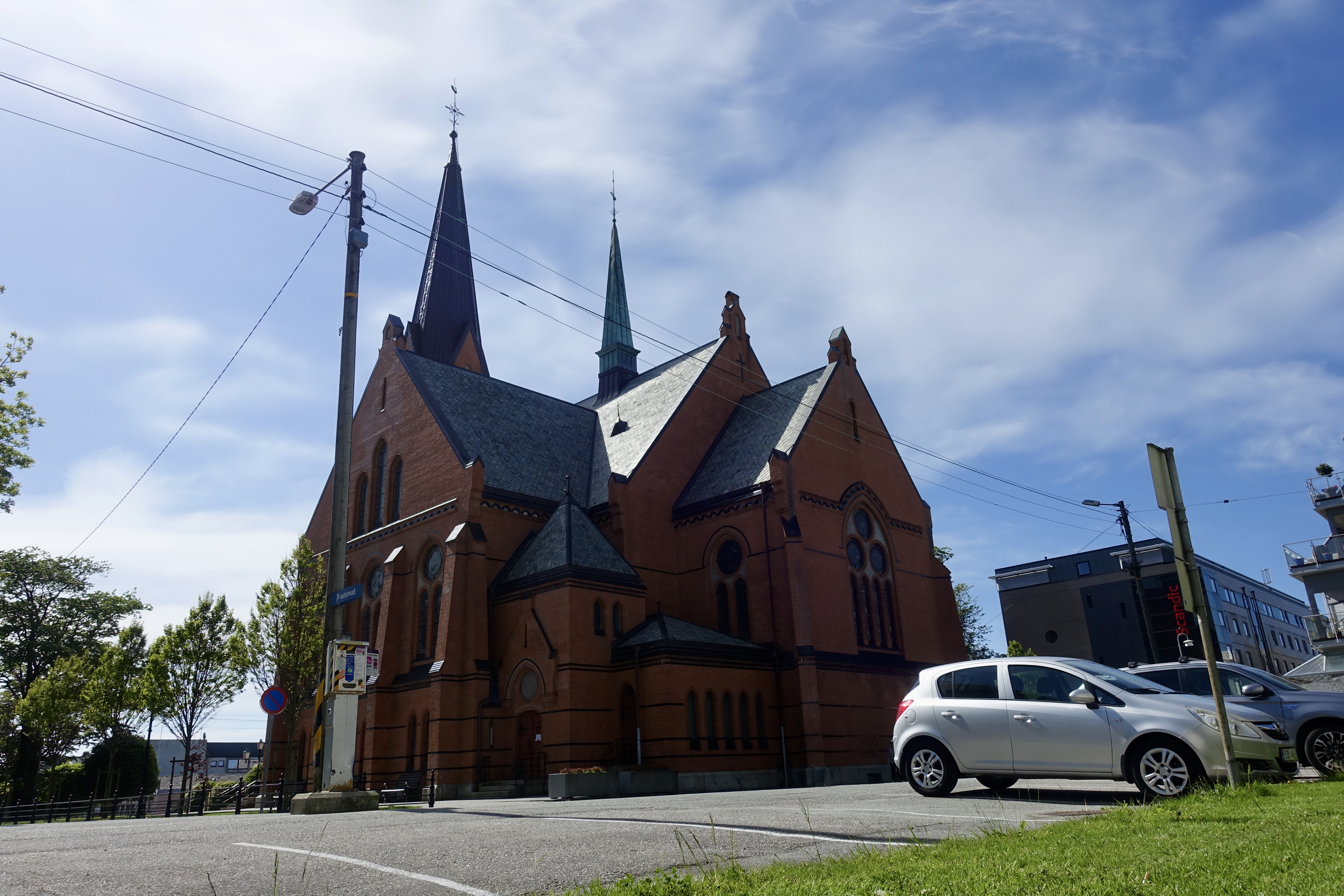

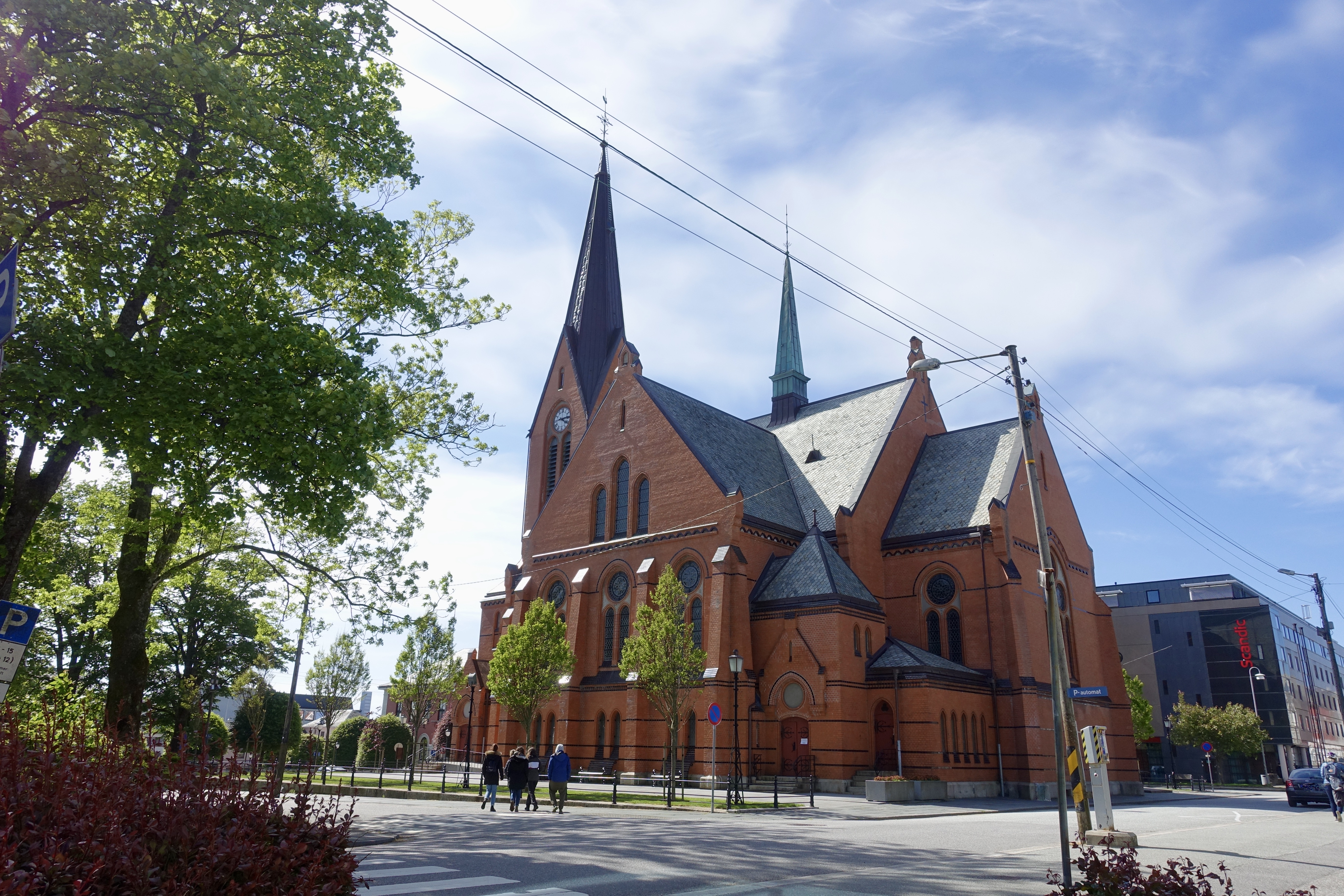

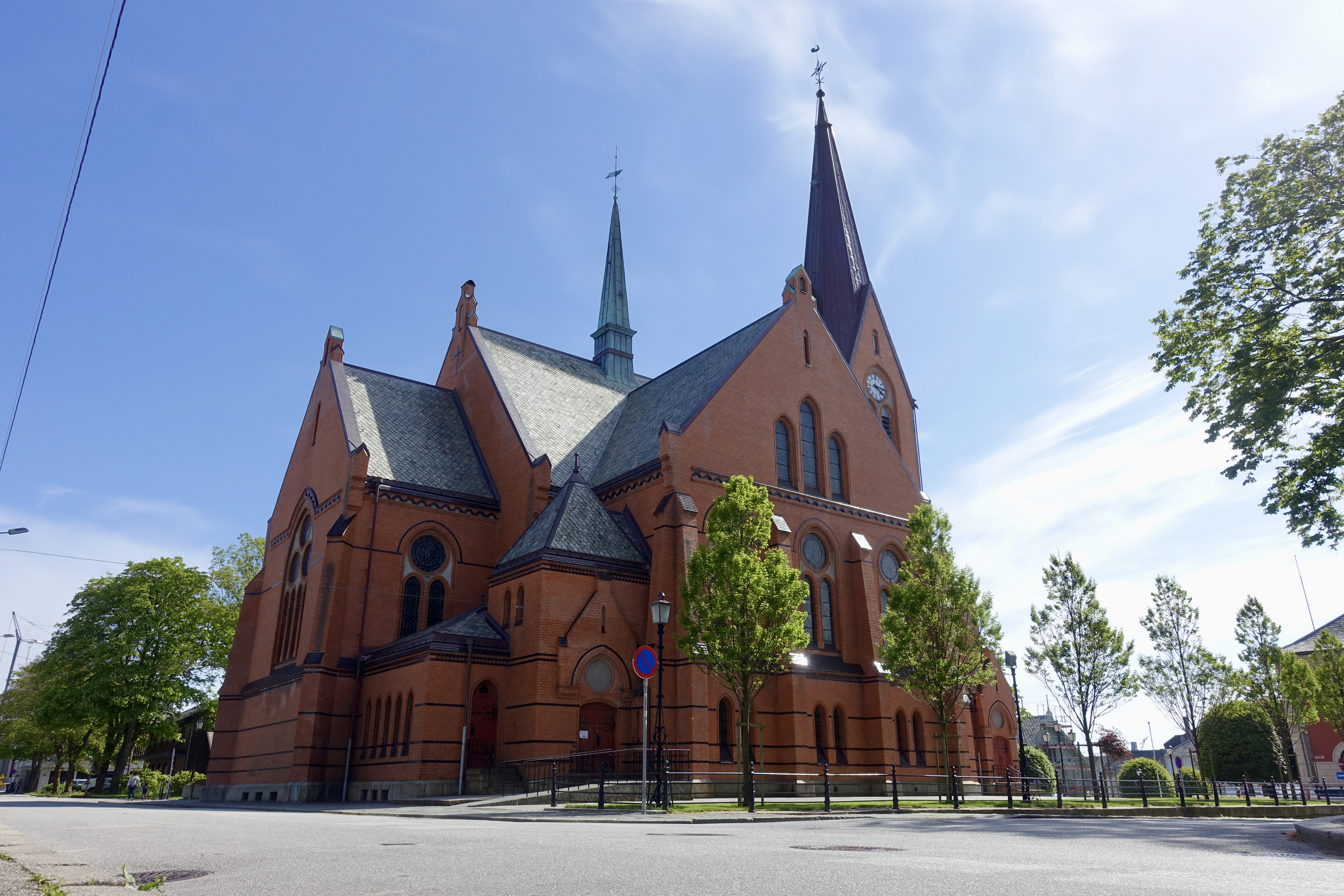

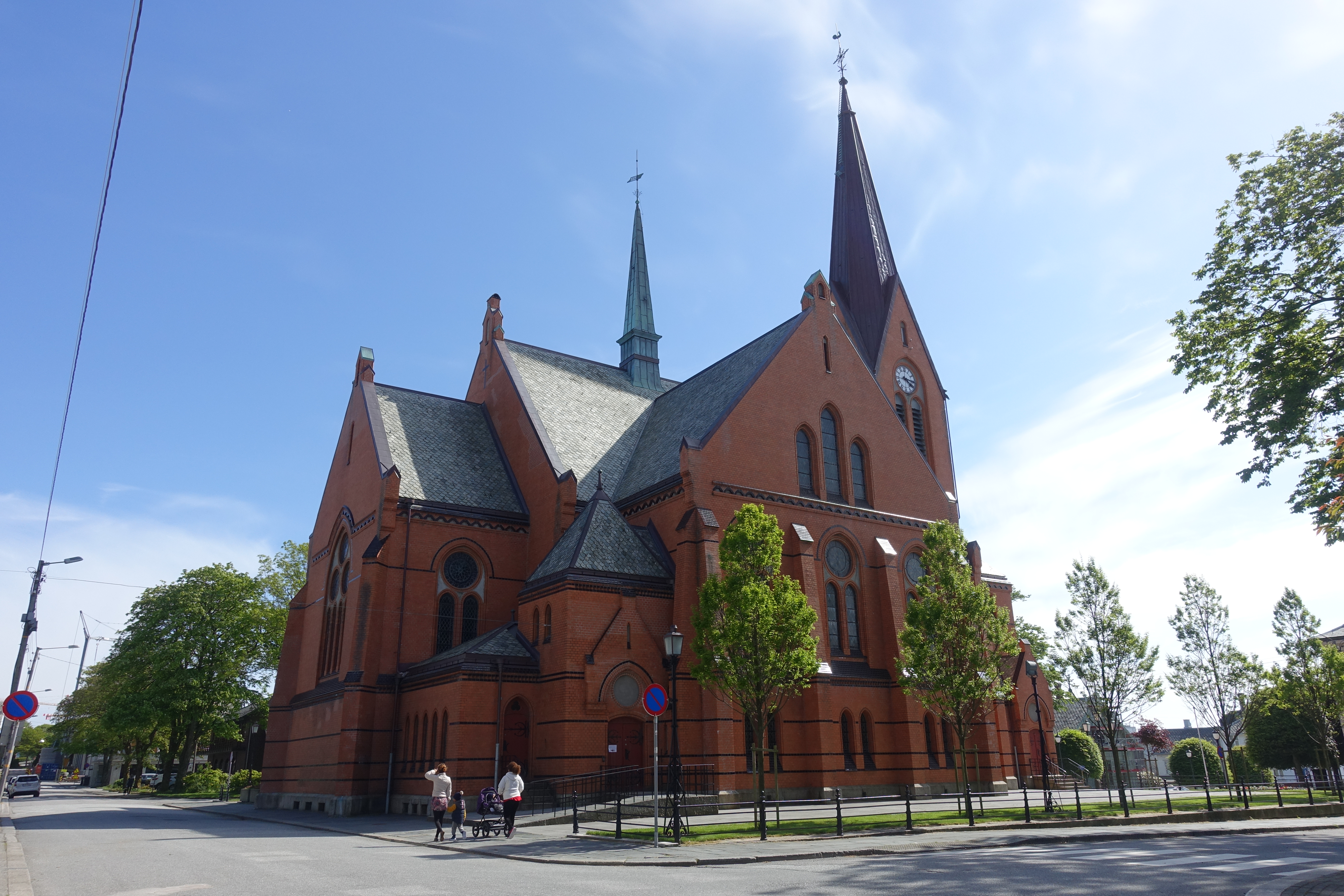

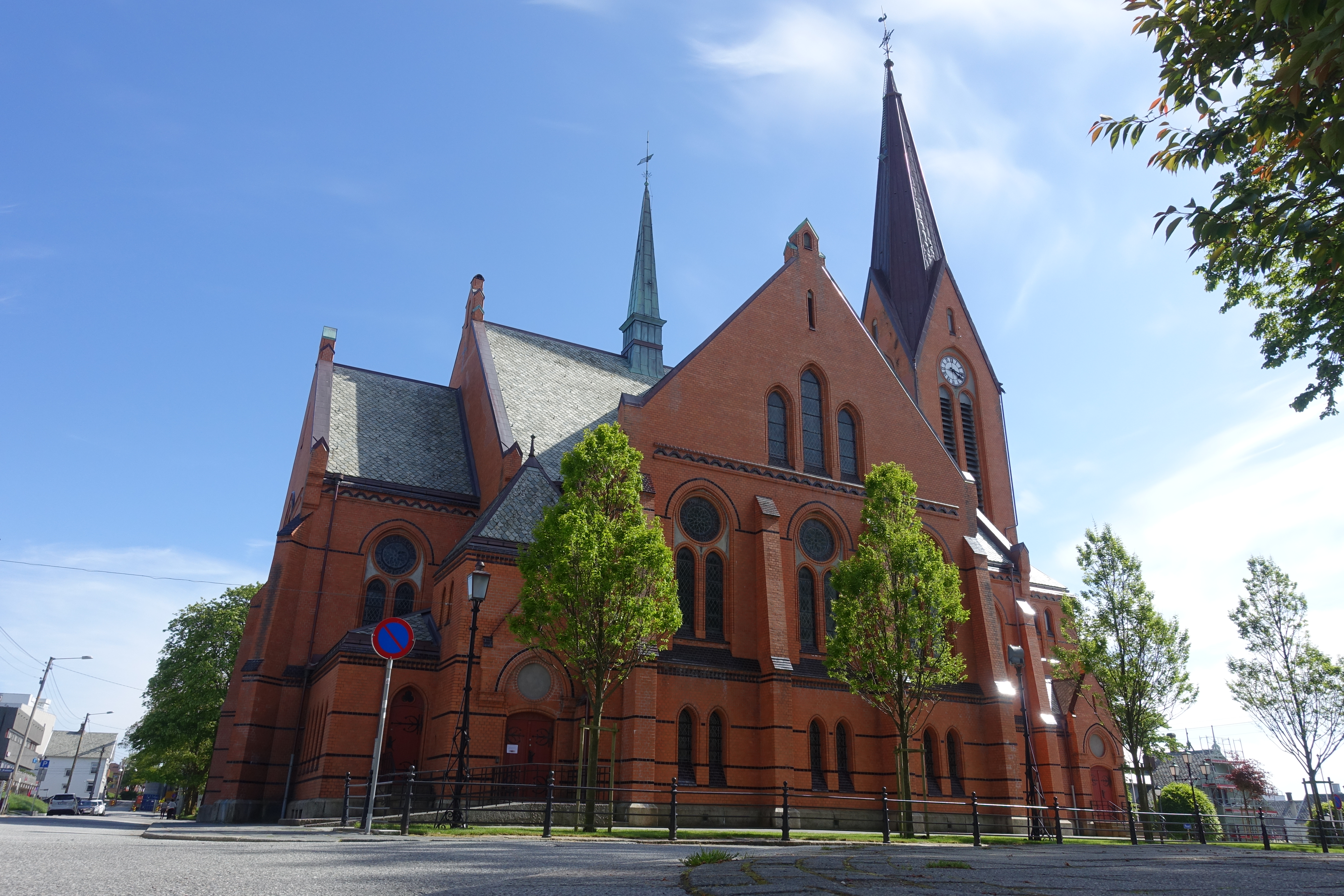

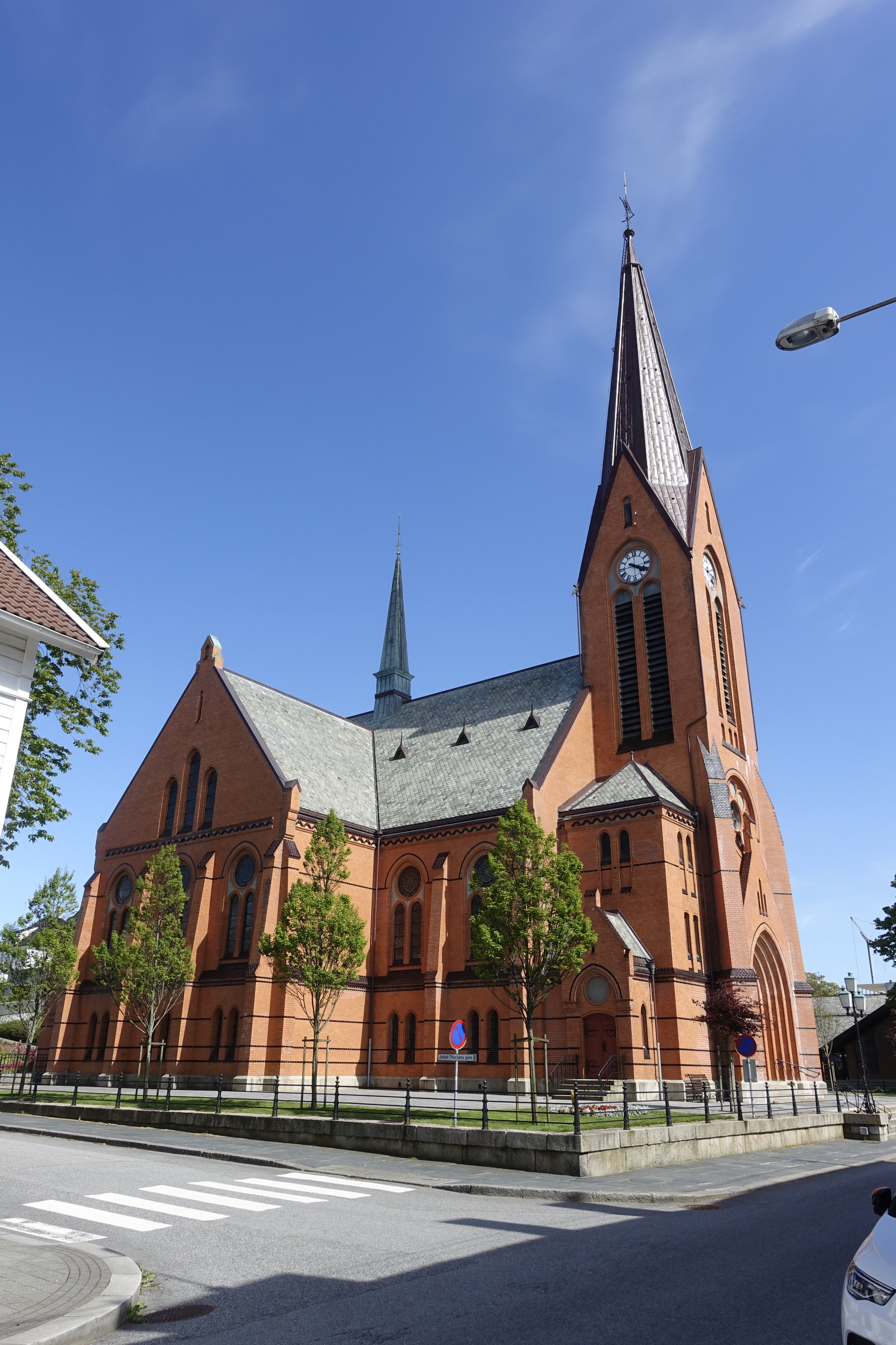

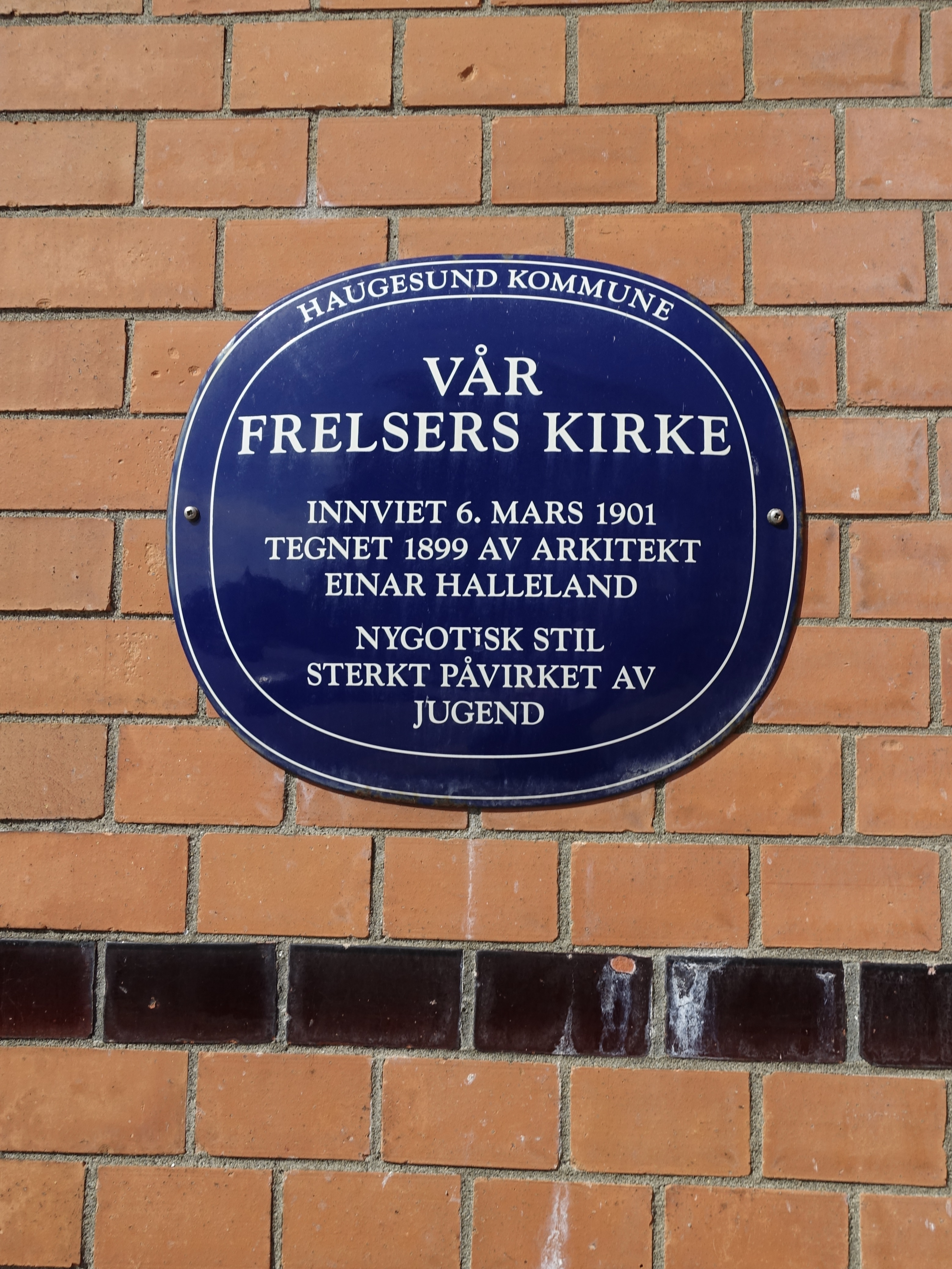

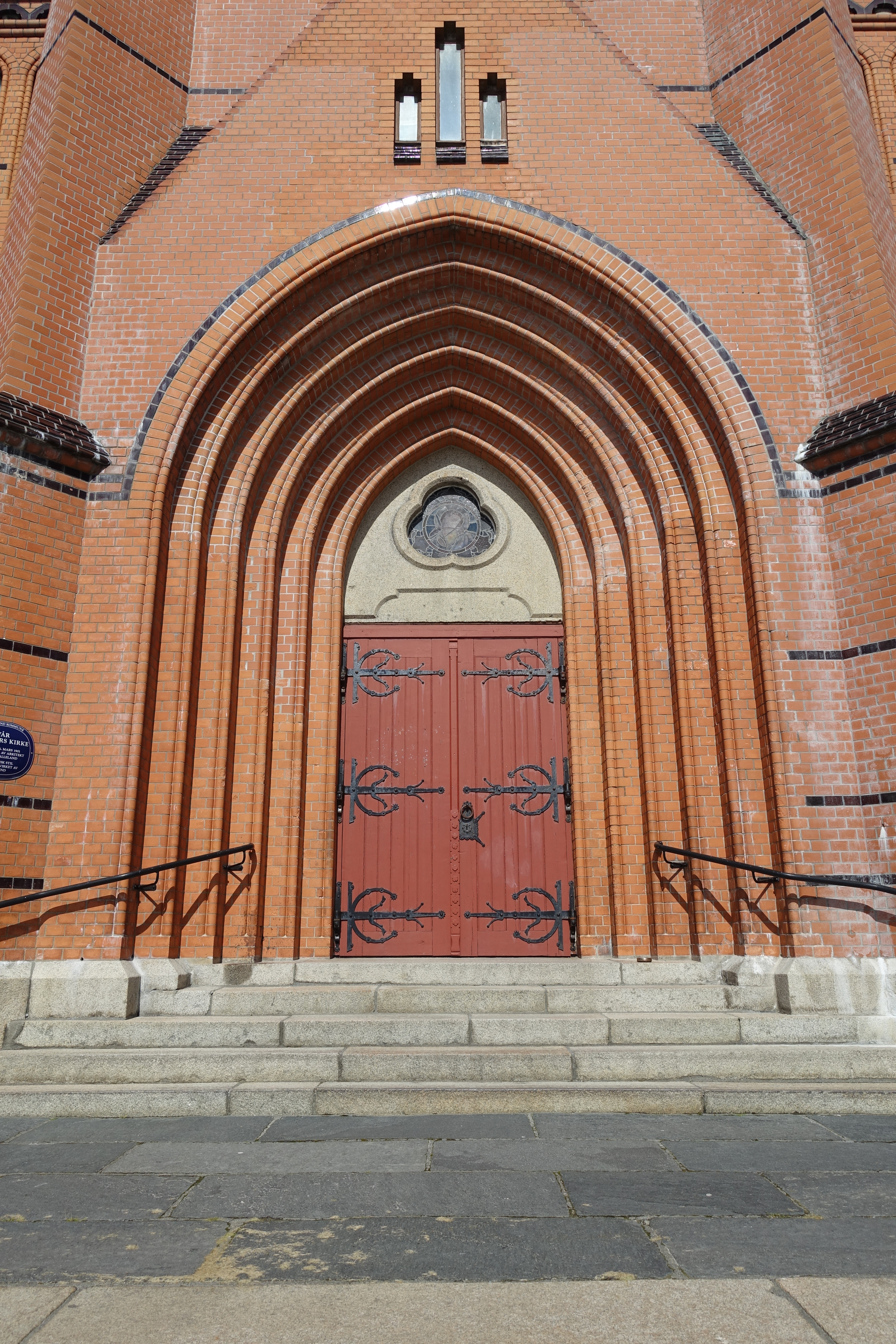
Main entrance

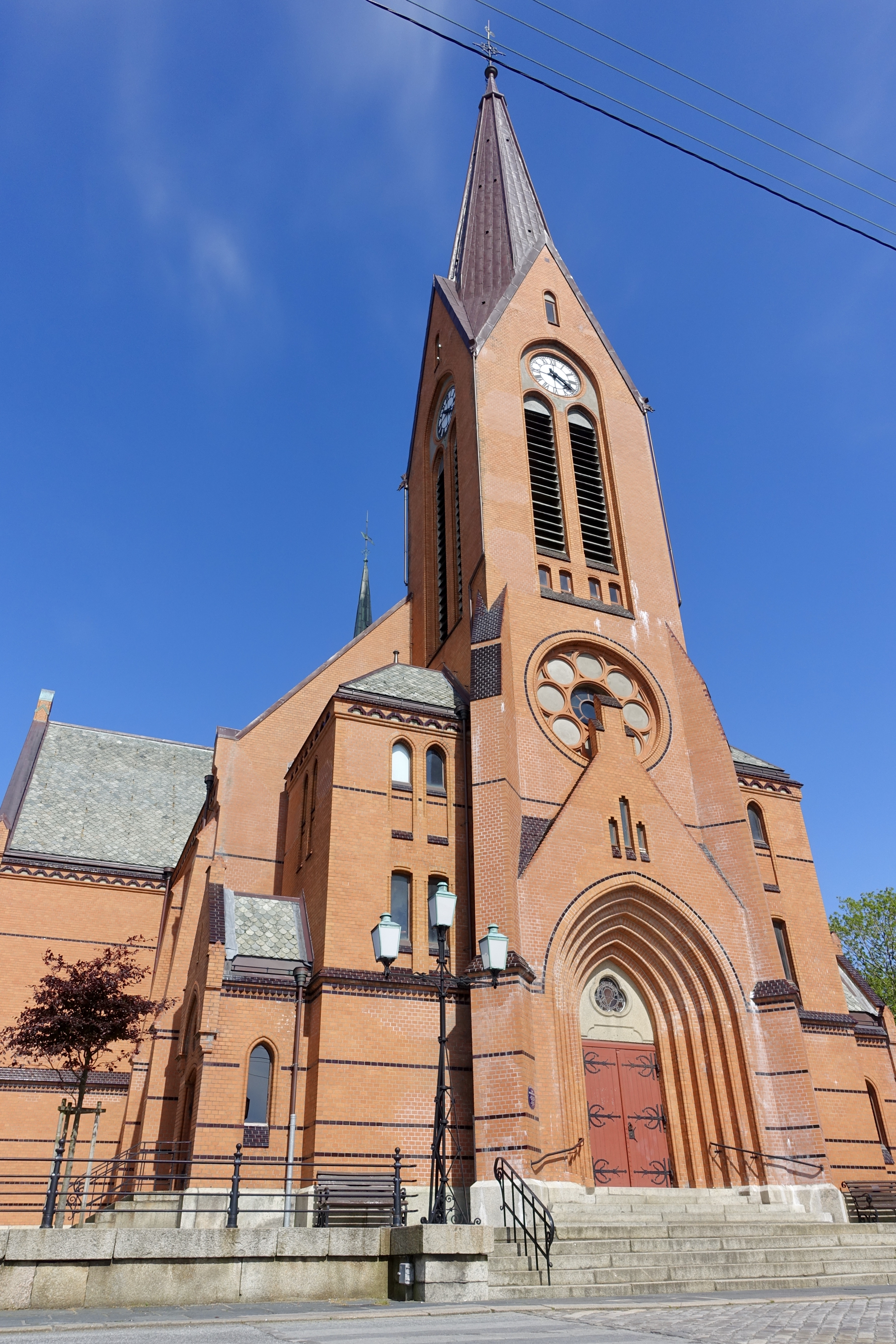

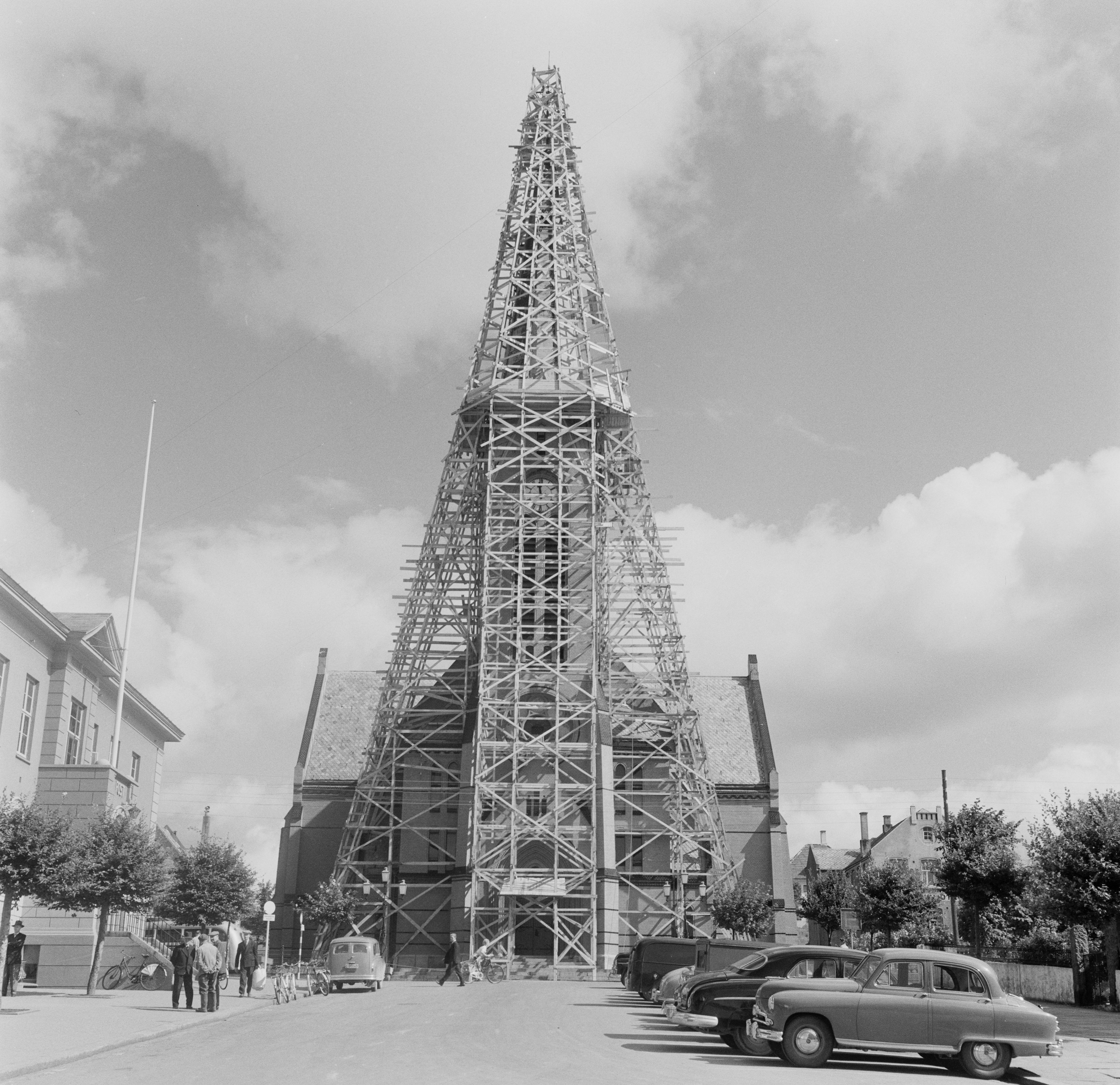
Exterior renovations in 1953

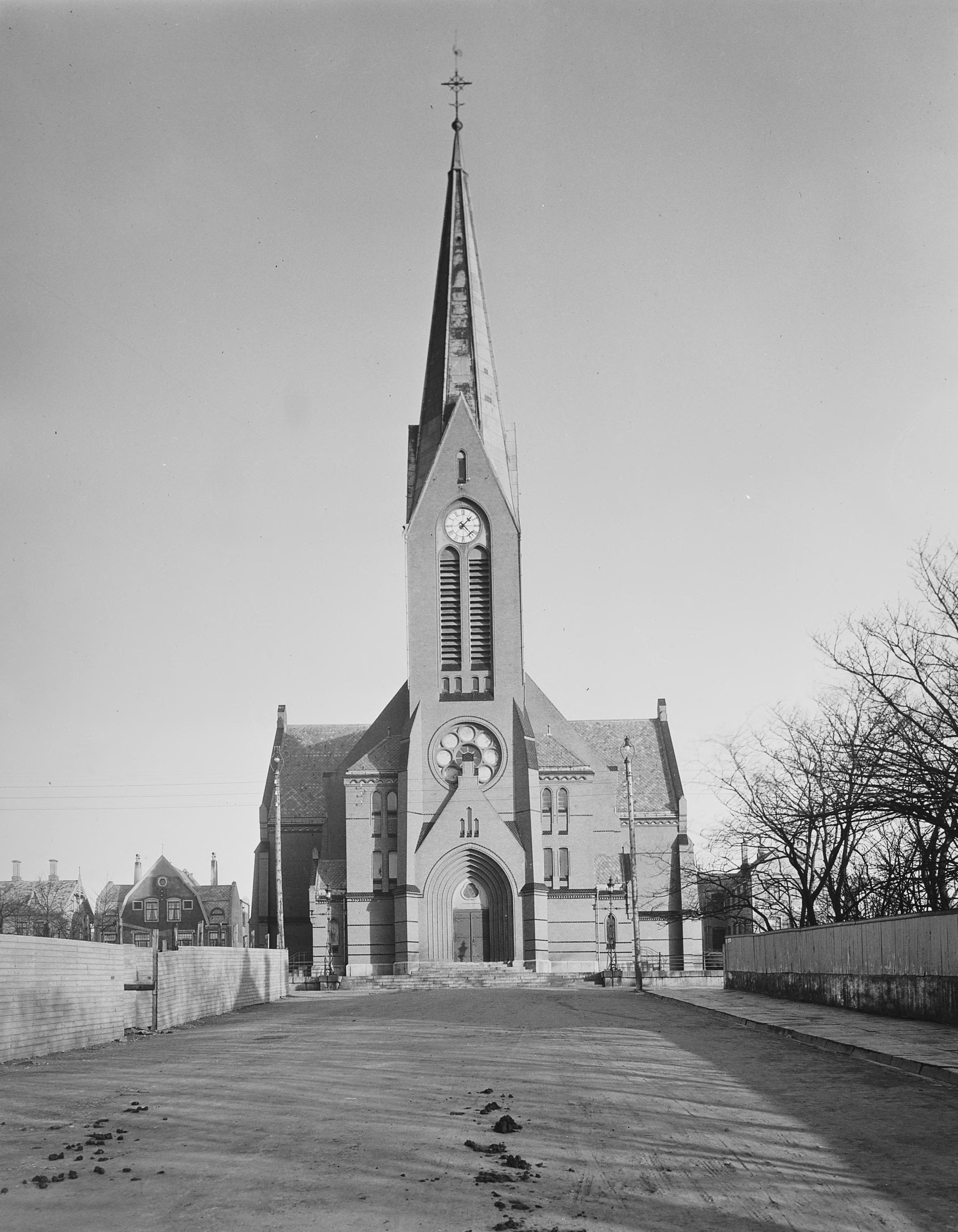
View in 1925

== See also ==
- List of churches in Rogaland
