= Skåre Church =

Church in Rogaland, Norway

- Skåre kirke
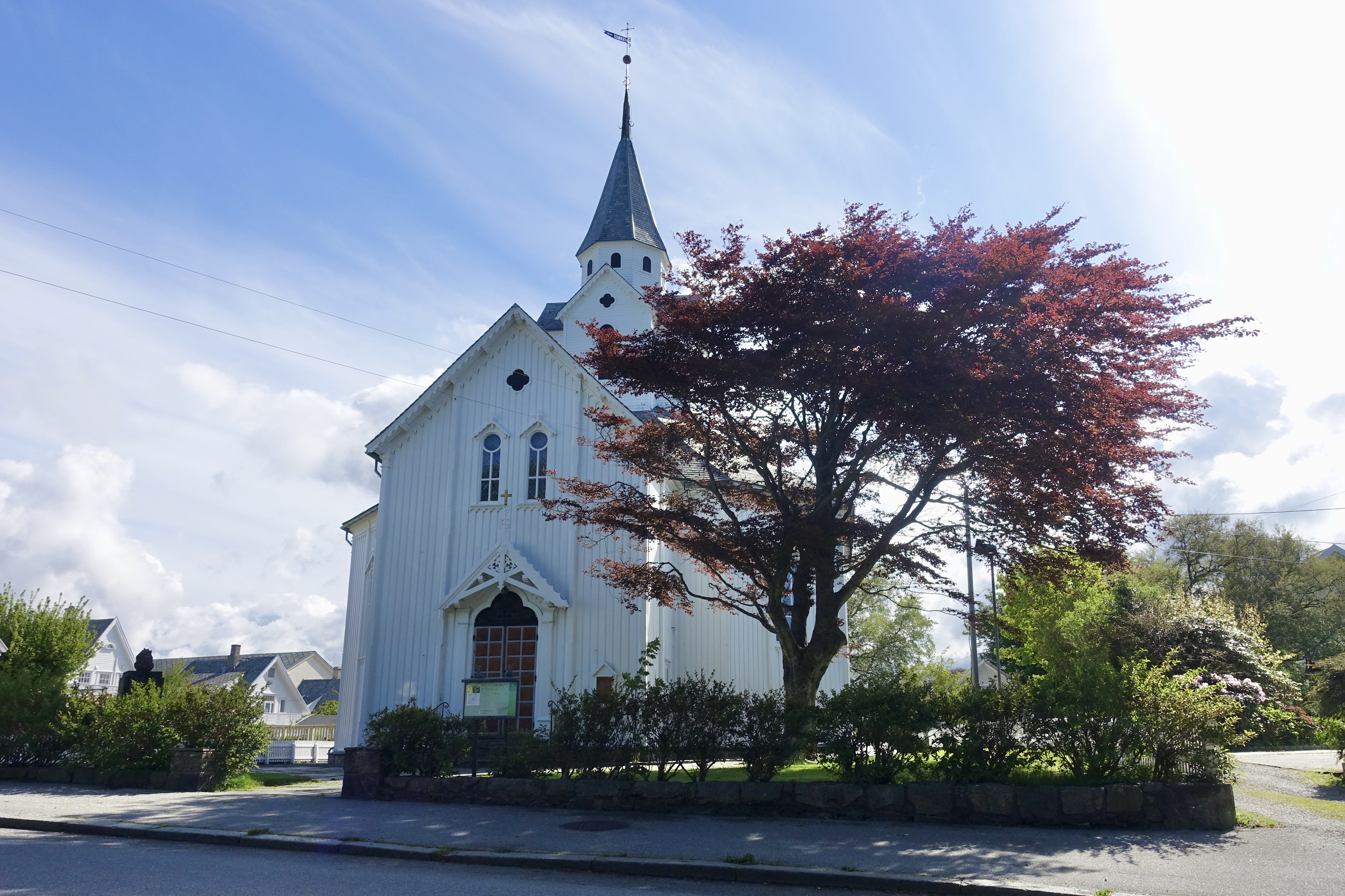
- View of the church
- Skåre Church
- 59.419496°N 5.263322°E
- Location: Haugesund Municipality, Rogaland
- Country: Norway
- Denomination: Church of Norway
- Churchmanship: Evangelical Lutheran

History
- Former name: Haugo kirke
- Status: Parish church
- Founded: 12th century
- Consecrated: 7 July 1858

Architecture
- Functional status: Active
- Architect: Christian Heinrich Grosch
- Architectural type: Octagonal
- Completed: 1858 (168 years ago)

Specifications
- Capacity: 450
- Materials: Wood

Administration
- Diocese: Stavanger bispedømme
- Deanery: Haugaland prosti
- Parish: Skåre
- Norwegian Cultural Heritage Site
- Type: Church
- Status: Protected
- ID: 85491

Skåre Church (Norwegian: Skåre kirke) is a parish church of the Church of Norway in Haugesund Municipality in Rogaland county, Norway. It is located in the town of Haugesund. It is one of the two churches for the Skåre parish which is part of the Haugaland prosti (deanery) in the Diocese of Stavanger. The white, wooden church was built in a octagonal style in 1858 using designs by the architect Christian Heinrich Grosch. The church seats about 450 people.

== History ==
The earliest existing historical records of the church date back to the year 1301, but the church was not new that year. Historically, the old church was known as Haugo Church. The first church here was a stave church that was actually located across the street from its present location. On 15 May 1301, Bishop Arne of the Ancient Diocese of Stavanger wrote that he was on a visit to Karmøy and Skåre. According to the historian, Snorri Sturluson, King Harald Hårfagre was buried on Haugo (the old name for this area). The old stave church was repaired in 1620. In 1639, the church was torn down and a new church was built on the same site.

In 1854, the town of Haugesund was established and it was separated from the rest of Torvastad Municipality to form a municipality of its own. The only local church close to the town was Skåre Church which was a small building, so a new main church was needed for the area. It was decided to build a new, larger Skåre Church, just outside the town of Haugesund to serve that part of Torvastad as well as the town of Haugesund. The two municipalities (Torvastad and Haugesund) split the cost with Haugesund Municipality paying 6,619 Norwegian speciedaler and Torvastad Municipality paid 5,679 Norwegian speciedaler for a grand total of 12,299 Norwegian speciedaler and 23 skilling. The new church was built across the street from the small Skåre Church and after it was completed in 1859, the old church was torn down. The new church was consecrated on 7 July 1858 and it served the town of Haugesund as well as the Skåre parish of Torvastad. It was not until 1901, when the town of Haugesund received its own church, Vår Frelsers Church.

== Gallery ==
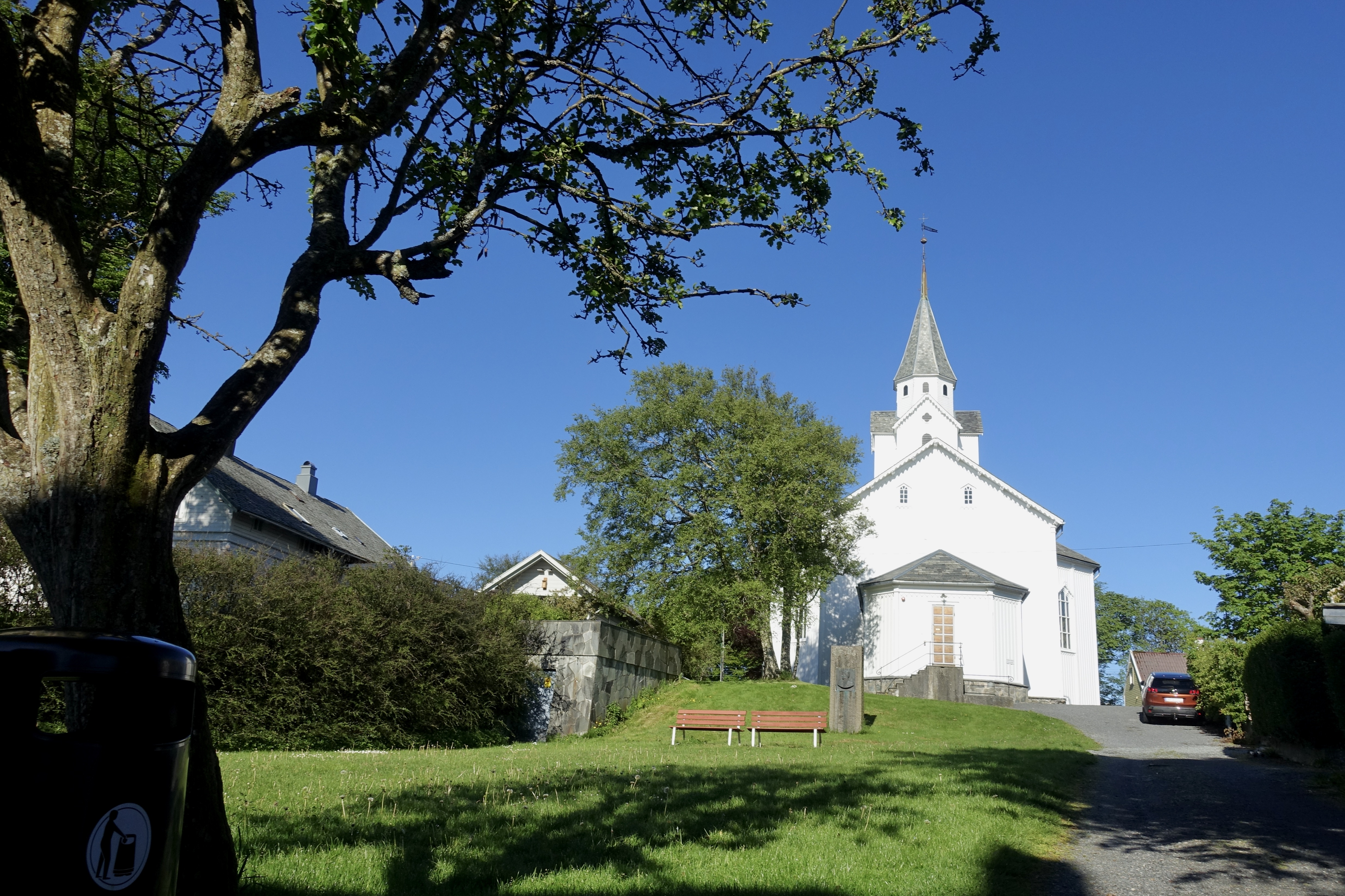

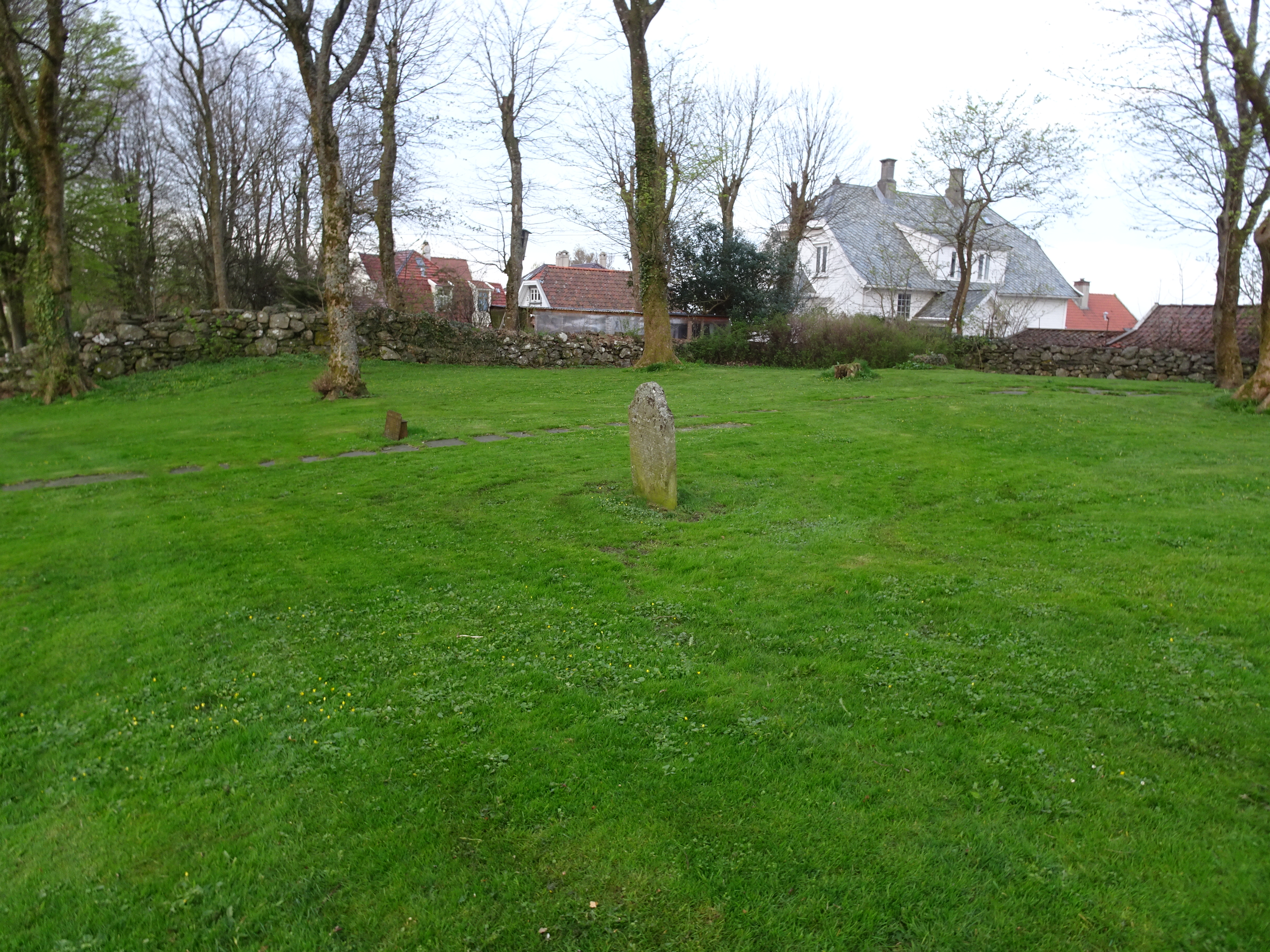
View of the site of the old church

== See also ==
- List of churches in Rogaland
