= List of disasters in Norway by death toll =

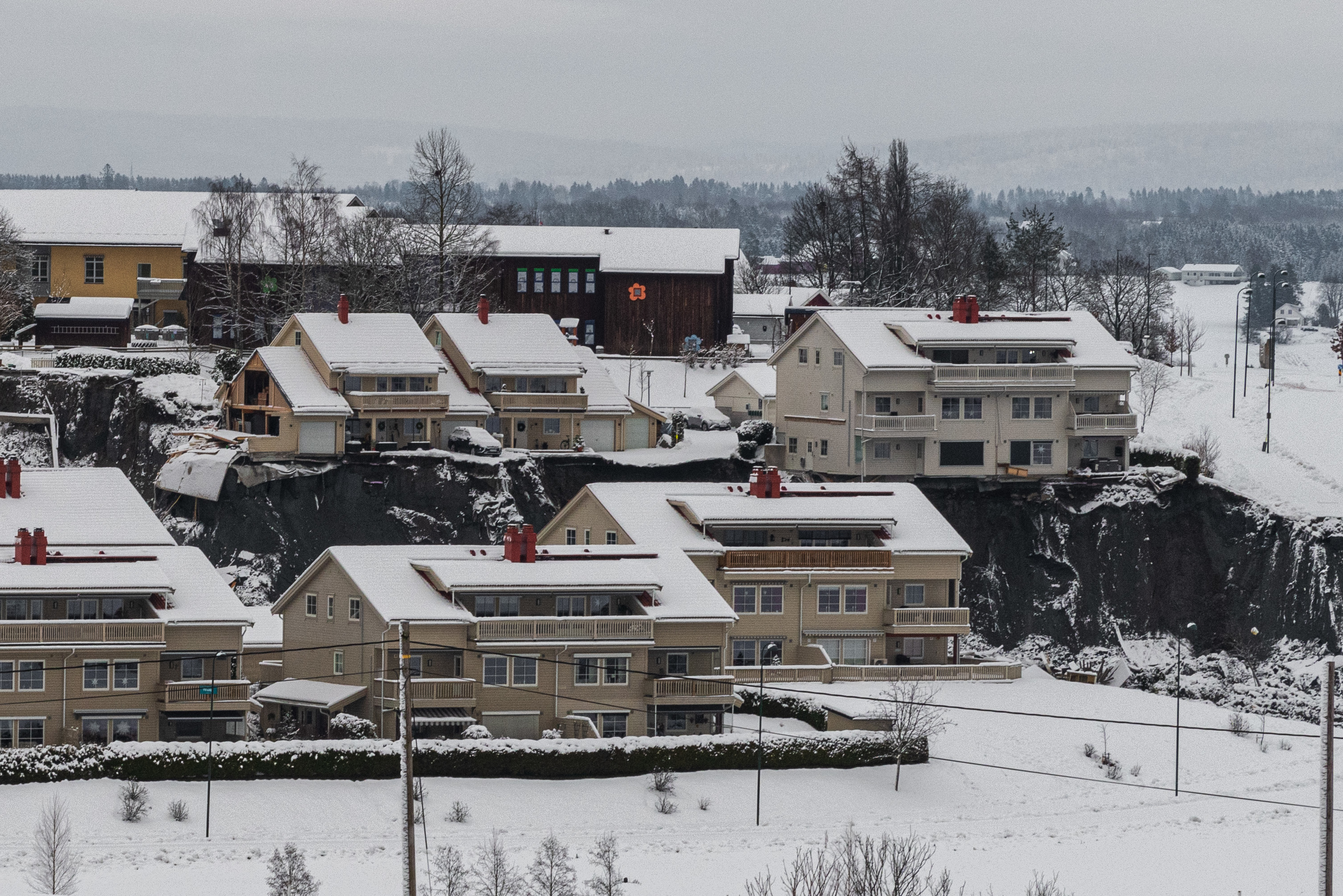
Aftermath of the 2020 Gjerdrum landslide

This list of Norwegian disasters by death toll includes major disasters (excluding acts of war) that occurred on Norwegian soil or involved Norwegian citizens, in a definable incident, where the loss of life was 10 or more.

== 200 or more deaths ==
Fatalities	Year	Article	Type	Location	Comments
300,000+	1349-1351	Black Death in Norway	Pandemic	Nationwide	
7,308-15,000+	1917-1920	Spanish flu	Pandemic	Nationwide	
3,908	2020-present	COVID-19 pandemic	Pandemic	Nationwide	
ca. 2570	1944	The "Rigel" disaster [no]	Ship bombing	Strait outside Tjøtta, Nordland	
2,000+	1654	The plague in Eastern Norway	Epidemic	Eastern Norway	
1,421	1853-1854	1853 Oslo Cholera outbreak	Epidemic	Oslo and surrounding regions	
1,350	1848-1850	1848 Bergen Cholera outbreak	Epidemic	Bergen and surrounding regions of Western Norway	
817	1833-1834	1833 Eastern Norway Cholera outbreak	Epidemic	Oslo and Eastern Norway	
500	1345	Gauldal landslides	Landslide	Gauldal, Trøndelag	
400	1853-1857	1853 Eastern Norway Cholera outbreak	Epidemic	Eastern Norway	
400-600	1594	1594 Stadlandet storm	Storm	Stadhavet (off Stad), Western Norway	
300	1822	Galnemåndagen	Hurricane	Western Norway	
225	1904	Sinking of the SS Norge	Shipwreck	near Rockall	
210	1625	First Gjæsling disaster	Storm	Folda, Trøndelag	

== 100 to 199 deaths ==
Fatalities	Year	Article	Type	Location	Comments
159	1990	MS Scandinavian Star fire	Ship fire (arson)	Skagerrak, North Sea	136 of the victims were Norwegian
158	1944	1944 Bergen explosion	Explosion	Bergen, Vestland	
141	1996	Vnukovo Airlines Flight 2801	Plane crash	Operafjellet, Svalbard	
140	1679	February 16 avalanches	Avalanches	Møre og Romsdal	
140	1899	Titran disaster	Shipwreck	Frøya, Trøndelag	
130	1893	Storm in Lofoten and Vesterålen	Storm	Vesterålen and Lofoten, Nordland	
129	1869	1869 Avalanches	Avalanches	Møre og Romsdal	
123	1980	Alexander L. Kielland disaster	Oil disaster	Ekofisk field, North Sea	
120	1943	1943 Filipstad explosion	Explosion	Oslo	
116	1822	Grue Church fire	Building fire	Grue, Innlandet	
116	1893	Verdal landslide	Landslide	Verdal, Trøndelag	

== 10 to 99 deaths ==
Fatalities	Year	Article	Type	Location	Comments
96-100	1868	1868 Lofoten storm	Storm	Lofoten, Nordland	
90	1726	1726 Senja storm	Storm	Senja, Troms	
84 (Norwegians)	2004	2004 Indian Ocean tsunami	Tsunami	Southeast Asia	
78	1952	West Ice accidents	Shipwrecks	Arctic Ocean east of Greenland	
74	1936	1936 Loenvatnet landslide and megatsunami	Landslide and megatsunami	Loen, Nordfjord	
63	1789	Storofsen flood	Flood	Hedmark	
61	1905	Loenvatnet landslide tsunami	Landslide and megatsunami	Loen, Nordfjord	
55	1989	Partnair Flight 394	Plane crash	Offshore of Hirtshals, Denmark	52 of the victims were Norwegian
45	1811	1811 Arnafjorden landslide	Landslide	Arnafjorden, Vestland	
43	1913	Sinking of the DS Malmberget	Shipwreck	Norwegian Sea north of Myken, Nordland	
41	1962	Sinking of the MS Sanct Svithun	Shipwreck	Folda, Trøndelag	
41	1972	Braathens SAFE Flight 239	Plane crash	Asker, Akershus	
40	1934	Tafjord disaster	Landslide and megatsunami	Tafjorden, Møre og Romsdal	
40	1979	Sinking of the MS Berge Vanga	Shipwreck	Atlantic Ocean	
39	1961	1961 Holtaheia Vickers Viking crash	Plane crash	Holta, Rogaland	
36	1974	Sinking of the FV Gaul	Shipwreck	Barents Sea, Finnmark	
36	1988	Widerøe Flight 710	Plane crash	Torghatten, Nordland	
35	1947	Kvitbjørn disaster	Plane crash	Lødingen, Nordland	
34	1901	Sandsundvær disaster	Tide surge	Sandsundvær, Nordland	
34	1949	Hurum air disaster	Plane crash	Hurum, Buskerud	
32	1756	Tjelle landslide	Landslide and megatsunami	Tjelle, Nesset, Møre og Romsdal	
32	1868	Oppdal avalanche	Avalanche	Trøndelag	
32	1956	Sinking of the SS Pelagia	Shipwreck	Offshore of the Skomvær Lighthouse, Nordland	
32	1972	Sinking of the MS Anita	Shipwreck	Atlantic Ocean off of New Jersey	
30	1733	1733 Oldedalen landslide	Landslide	Olden, Vestland	
30	1821	1821 Andenes storm	Storm	Andenes, Nordland	
30	1899	Røværulykken	Shipwreck	Røvær, Rogaland	
30	1951	Sinking of the MS Bess	Shipwreck	North Sea west of Denmark	
30	1968	Sinking of the MS Etnefjell	Shipwreck	North Atlantic	
30	1975	Sinking of the MS Berge Istra	Shipwreck	Pacific Ocean near the Philippines	Victims include 13 Norwegians
29	1938	Hegdehaugsveien 32 fire	Building fire	Oslo	
29	2009	2009 swine flu pandemic in Norway	Pandemic	Nationwide	
29	1973	Sinking of the MV Norse Variant	Shipwreck	Atlantic Ocean offshore of New Jersey	
27	1770	Hjørundfjord avalanche	Avalanche	Hjørundfjorden, Møre og Romsdal	
27	1975	Tretten train disaster	Train accident	near Tretten, Innlandet	
26	1806	1806 Vesterålen storm	Storm	Troms and Nordland	
25	1906	Second Gjæsling disaster	Storm	Foldafjord, Trøndelag	
25	1944	Breifoss disaster	Train collision	Breifoss, Buskerud	
25	1959	Stalheim Hotel fire	Building fire	Voss, Vestland	
24+	1849	1849 Lofoten storm	Storm	Lofoten, Nordland	
24	1947	Explosion and sinking of the SS Skoghaug	Ship explosion	North Sea off of the Netherlands	
23	1997	Barentsburg mine disaster	Mine disaster	Barentsburg, Svalbard	
22	1791	Trondheim dam breaks	Dam breaks	Trondheim, Trøndelag	
22	1940	Hommelvik train collision	Train collision	Hommelvik, Trøndelag	
21	1873	1873 Sogn avalanches	Avalanches	Sogn og Fjordane	
21	1954	Sinking of the FV Laforey	Shipwreck	Sendingane Reef, Sogn og Fjordane	
21	1956	1956 Lofoten and Vesterålen avalanches	Avalanches	Lofoten and Vesterålen, Nordland	
21	1962	King's Bay explosion	Explosion	Ny-Ålesund, Svalbard	
21 (Norwegians)	1921	Sinking of the Titanic	Shipwreck	Atlantic Ocean off of Newfoundland	
20	1625	Bakklandet mudslide	Mudslide	Bakklandet, Trøndelag	
20	1858	1858 Møre og Romsdal avalanches	Avalanche	Møre og Romsdal	
20	1969	Sinking of the MT ''Silja''	Ship collision	Mediterranean Sea off of Toulon, France	
20	1997	Sinking of the Leros Strength	Shipwreck	North Sea off of Stavanger, Rogaland	
19	1906	1906 Steine avalanche	Avalanche	Steine, Nordland	
19	1948	Bukken Bruse disaster	Plane crash	Hommelvik, Trøndelag	
19	1953	King's Bay disaster (1953)	Explosion	Ny-Ålesund, Svalbard	
19	1956	Sinking of the MFV Brenning	Shipwreck	Ervik, Vestland	
19	1963	Sinking of the ''Høegh Aronde''	Shipwreck	Atlantic Ocean off of Morocco	
19	2000	Åsta accident	Train collision	Åsta, Innlandet	
18	1737	1737 Storlidalen avalanche	Avalanche	Oppdal, Trøndelag	
18	1846	1846 Sunnylven avalanche	Avalanche	Møre og Romsdal	
18	1860	Luster avalanche	Avalanche	Luster, Sogn og Fjordane	
18	1929	Sinking of the DS ''Haakon VII''	Shipwreck	Askvoll, Sogn og Fjordane	
18	1978	Helikopter Service Flight 165	Helicopter crash	Statfjord oil field , North Sea	
18	2004	Sinking of the MV Rocknes	Shipwreck	South of Bergen, Vestland	
17	1731	Skafjellet disaster	Landslide and megatsunami	Stranda, Møre og Romsdal	
17	1755	Ørsta avalanche	Avalanche	Ørsta, Møre og Romsdal	
17	1760	Rissa mudslide	Mudslide	Rissa, Trøndelag	
17	1872	Svenskhuset Tragedy	Lead poisoning	Svenskehuset, Spitsbergen, Svalbard	
17	1924	Collision between the DS Haakon Jarl and DS ''Kong Haral''	Ship collision	Landegode, Nordland	
17	1945	Voksenkoll disaster	Plane crash	Voksenkollen, Oslo	
17	1928	Crash of the Italia	Airship crash	Nordaustlandet, Svalbard	
17	1972	Grytøya disaster	Plane crash	Grytøya, Troms	
16	1768	Skjea mudslide	Mudslide	Sørum, Akershus	
16	1948	Dunderland Valley bus crash	Bus crash	Dunderland Valley, Nordland	
16	1986	Vassdal accident	Avalanche	Narvik, Nordland	
16	1988	Måbødalen bus accident	Bus crash	Måbødalen, Vestland	
16	1999	Sinking of the MS Sleipner	Shipwreck	Off of Ryvarden Lighthouse, Hordaland	
15-20	1763	Stadhavet storm	Storm	Sogn og Fjordane	
15	1702	Borregaard mudslide	Mudslide	Sarpsborg, Østfold	
15	1816	Tiller landslide	Landslide	Trondheim, Trøndelag	
15	1948	King's Bay disaster (1948)	Explosion	Ny-Ålesund, Svalbard	
15	1982	Widerøe Flight 933	Plane crash	Barents Sea off Gamvik	
14	1946	Sinking of the Brattegga	Shipwreck	Vågan, Nordland	
14	1986	Hotel Caledonien fire	Building fire	Kristiansand, Agder	
14	1950	Hjuksebø train collision	Train collision	Hjuksebø, Telemark	
13	2016	CHC Helikopter Service Flight 241	Helicopter crash	Gullfaks oil field, North Sea	
12	1997	Helikopter Service Flight 451	Helicopter crash	Offshore of Brønnøysund, Nordland	
10	2020	2020 Gjerdrum landslide	Landslide	Gjerdrum, Akershus	

== Gallery ==
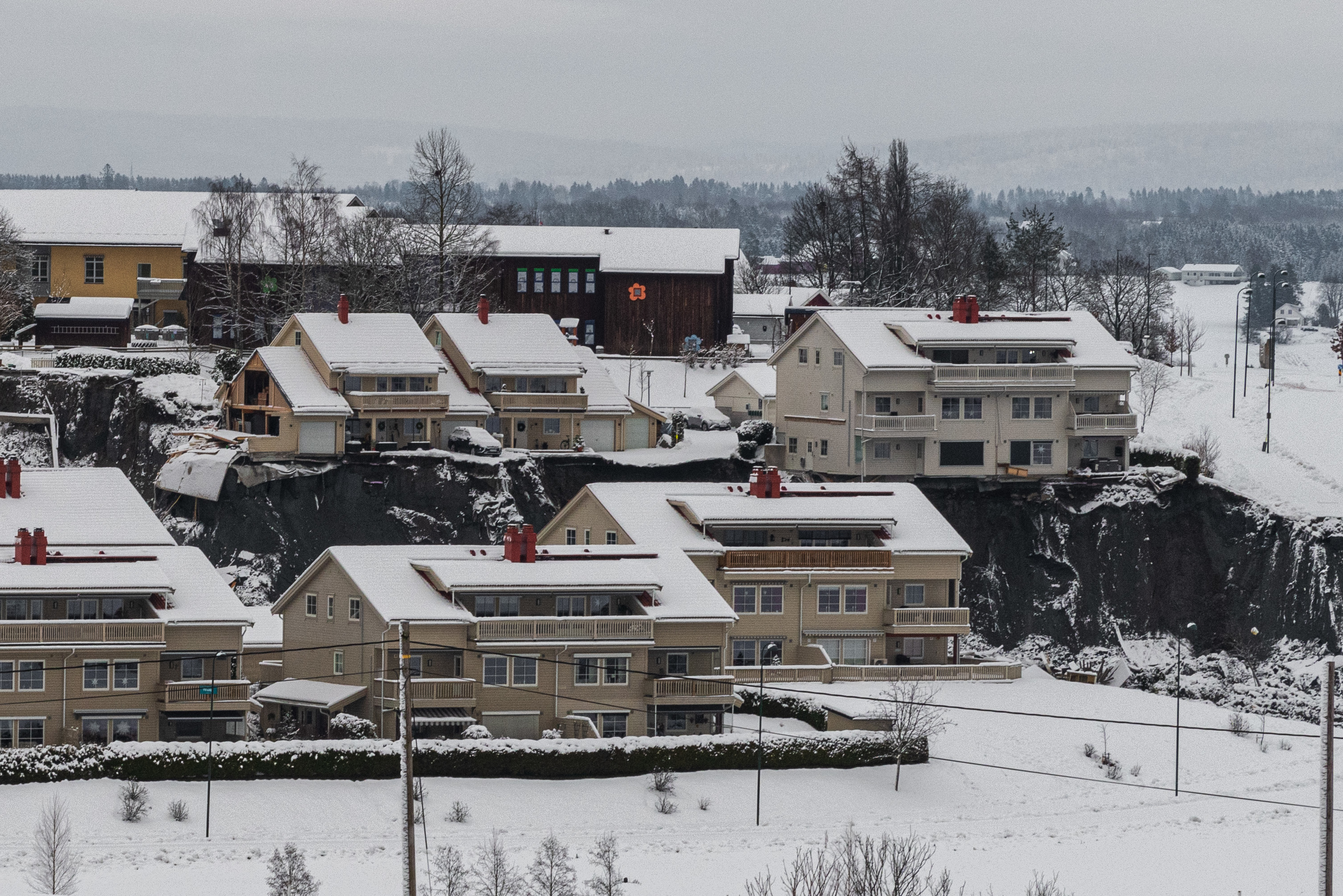
2020 Gjerdrum landslide

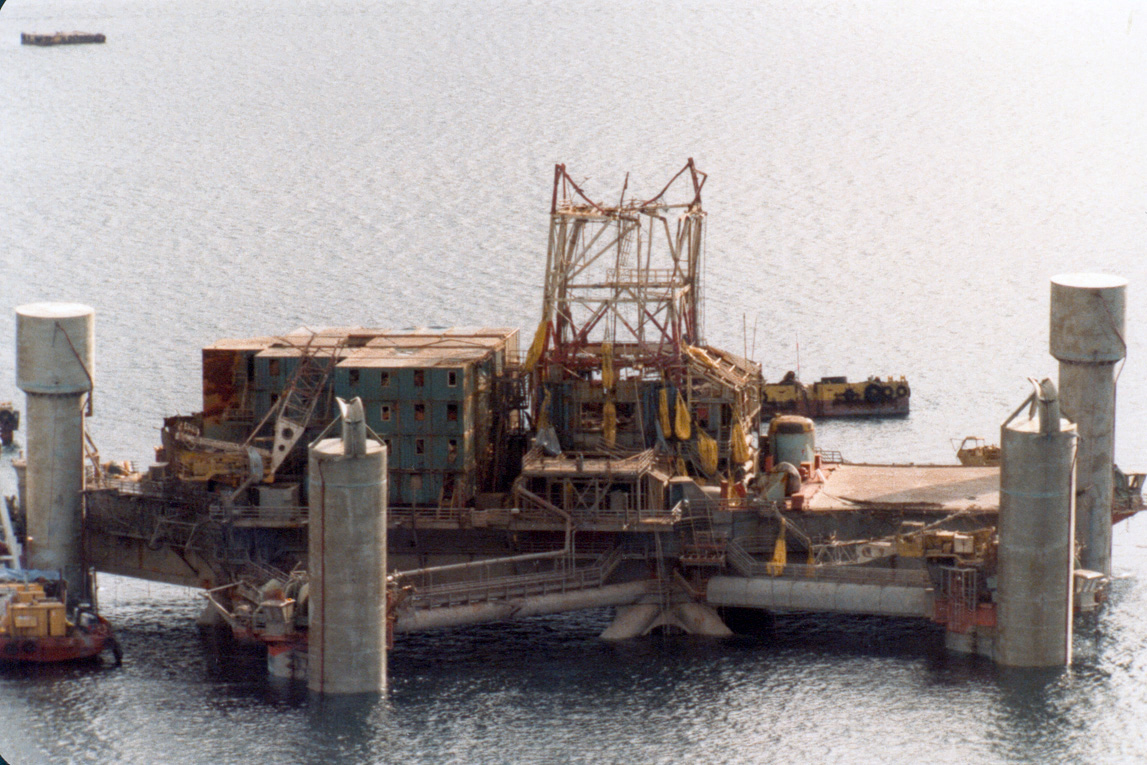
Alexnader L. Kielland disaster

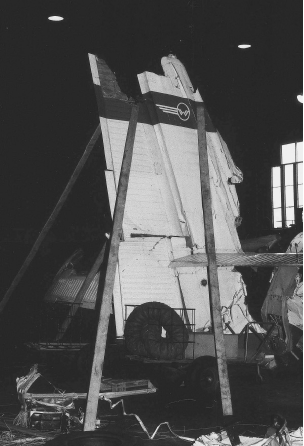
Widerøe Flight 933

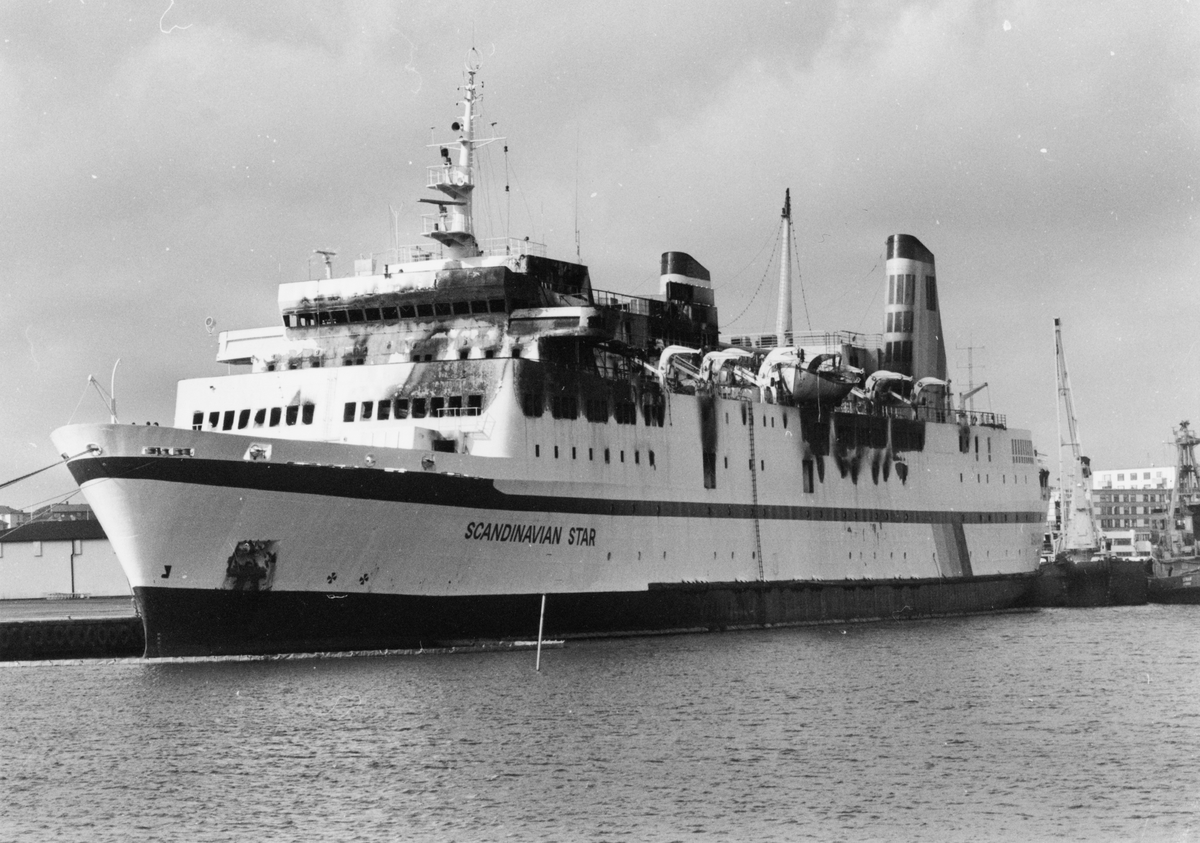
MS Scandinavian Star fire

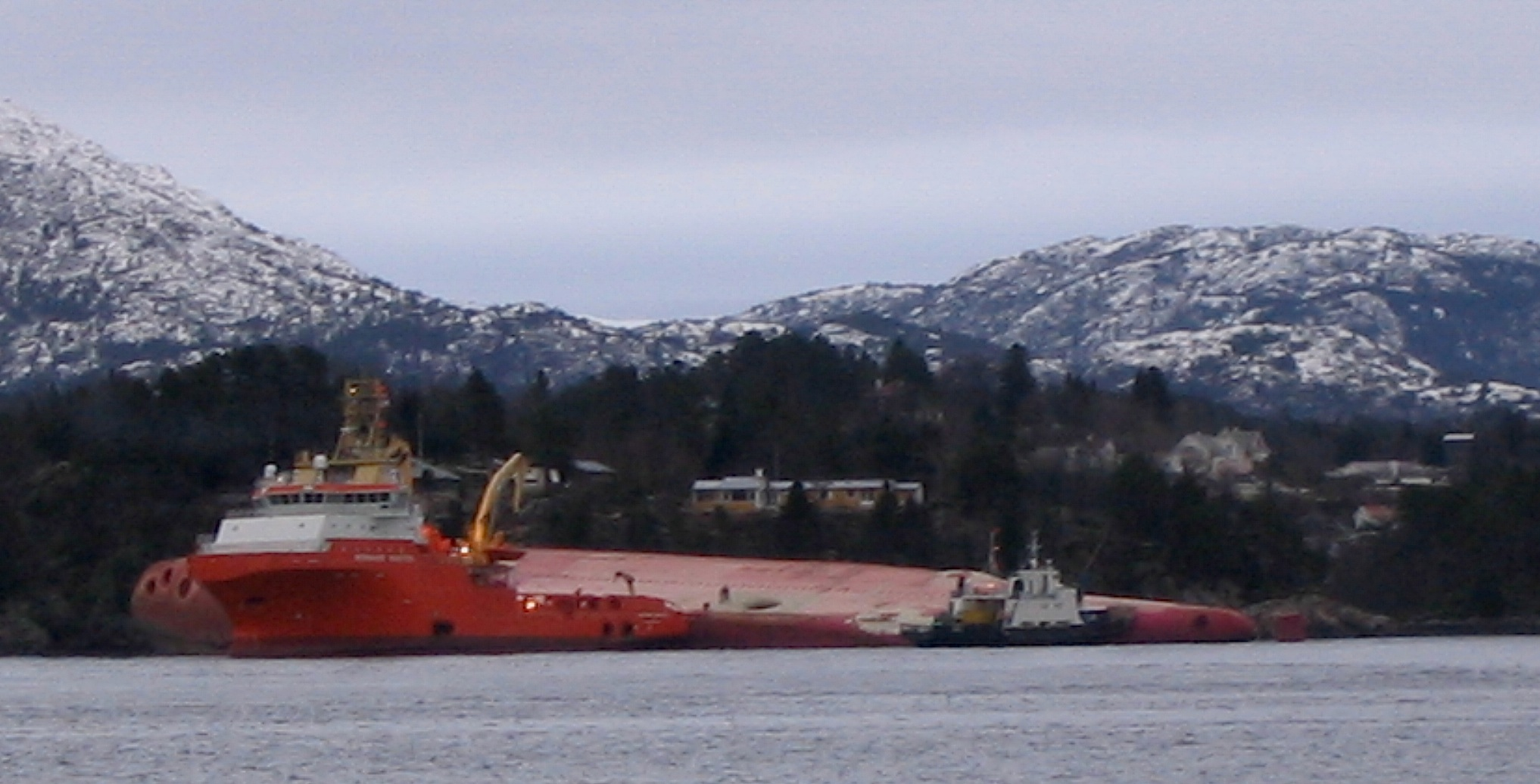
Sinking of the MV Rocknes

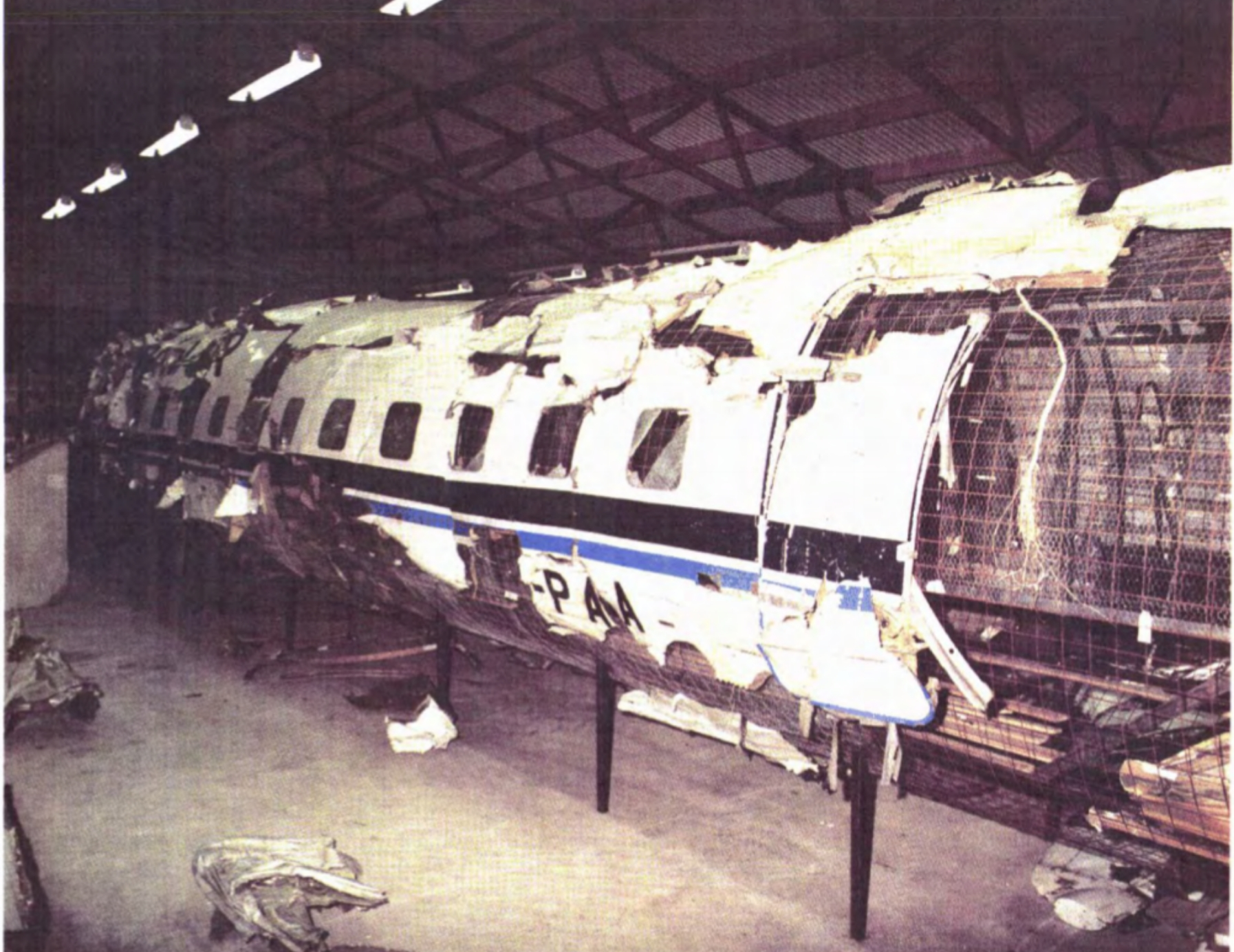
Partnair Flight 394

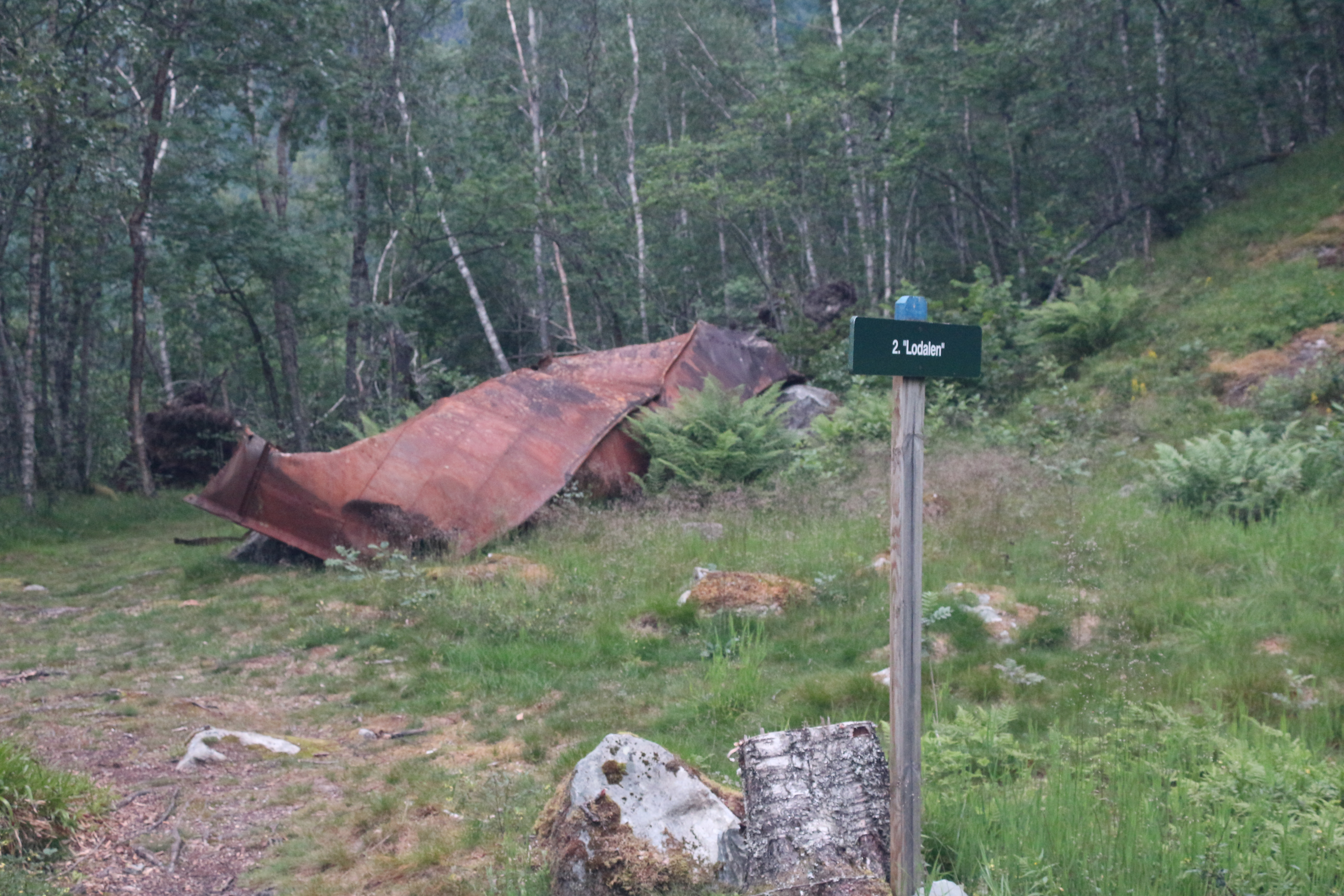
1936 Loenvatnet landslide and tsunami

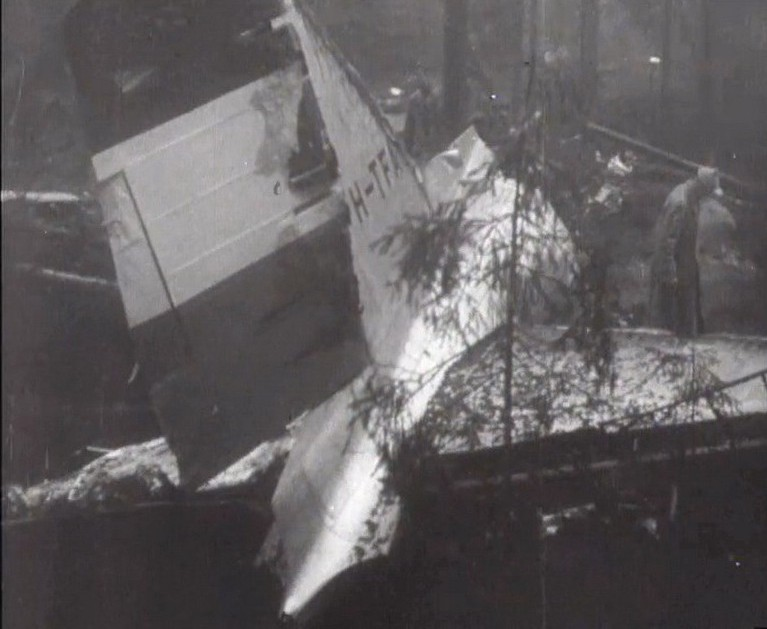
Hurum air disaster

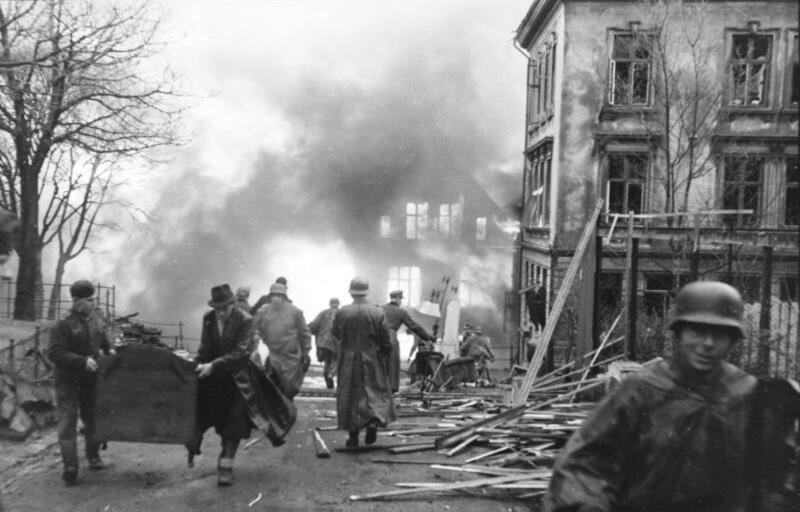
1944 Bergen explosion

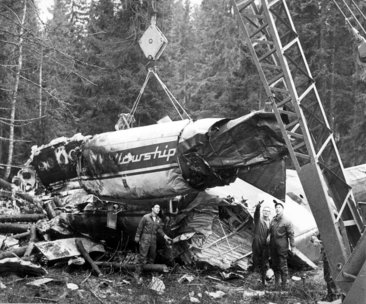
Braathens SAFE Flight 239

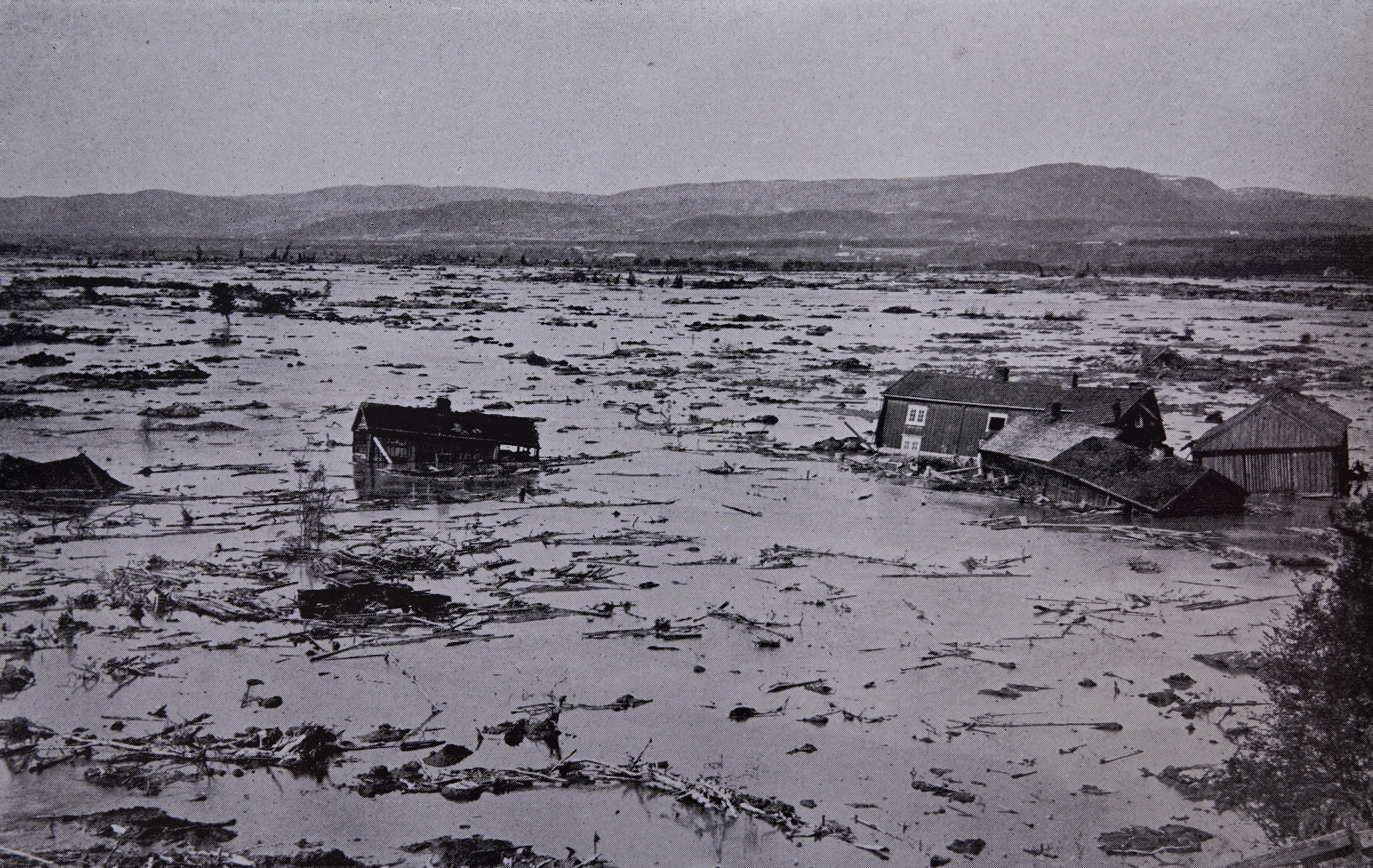
Verdal landslide

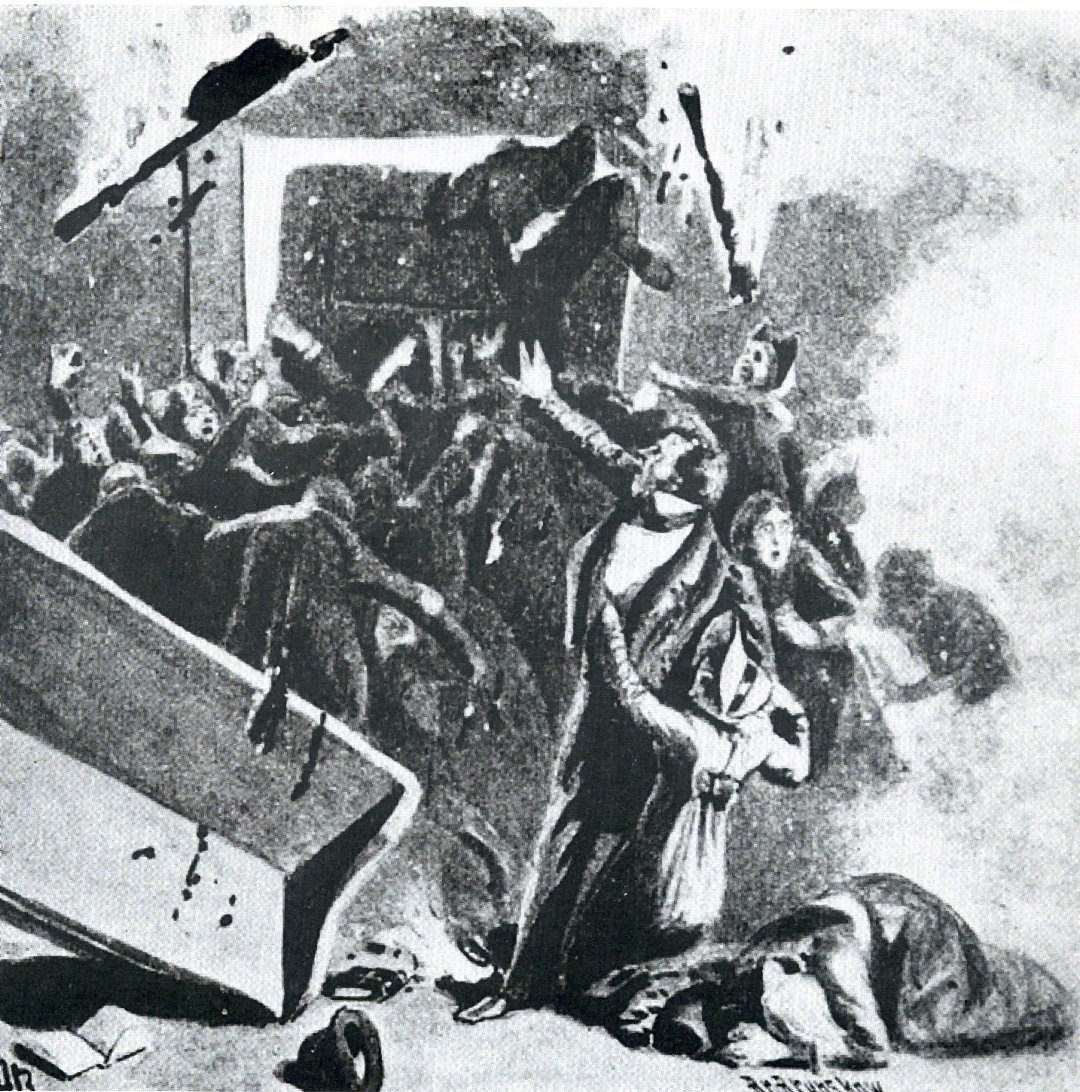
Grue Church fire

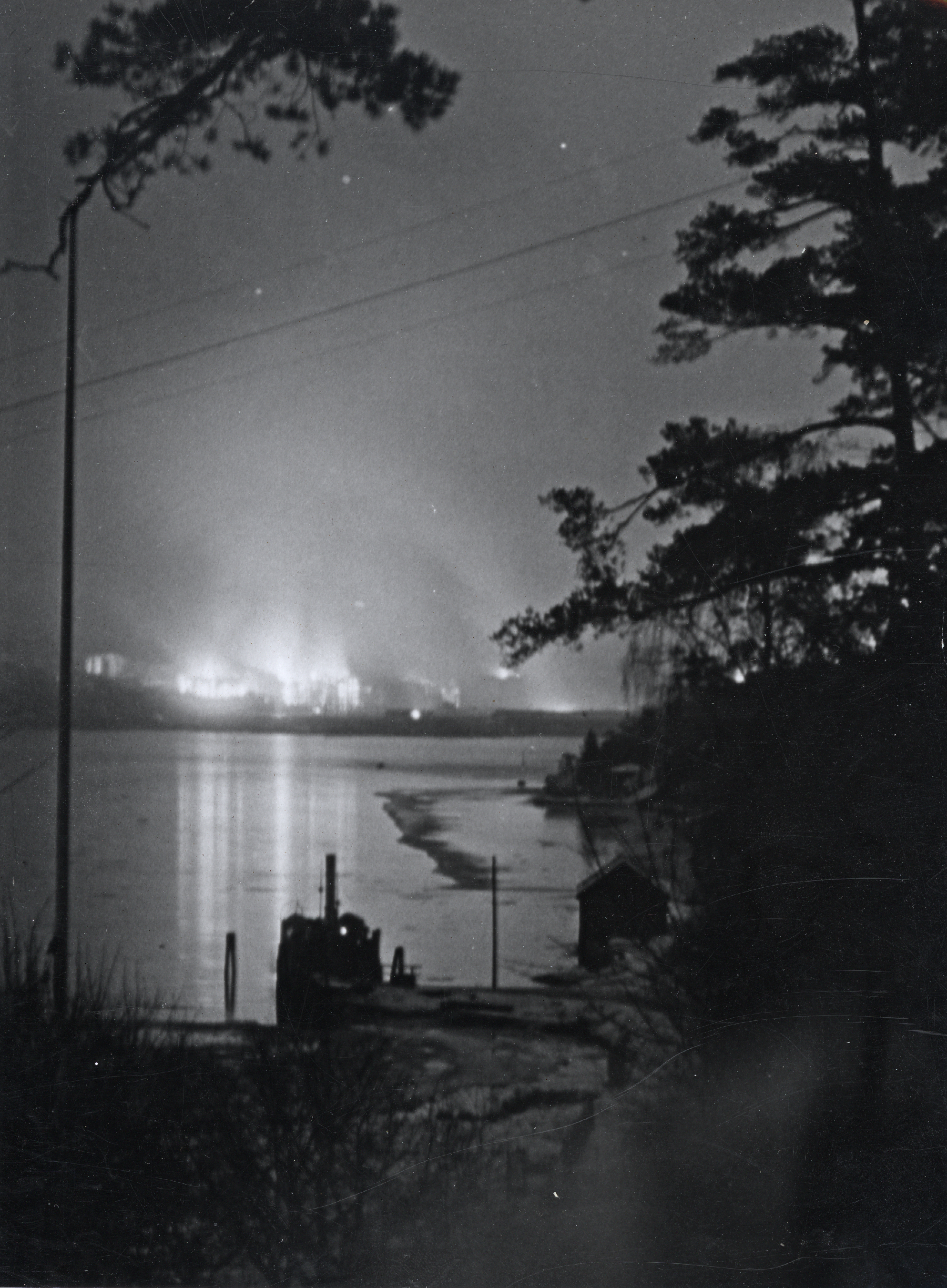
Filipstad explosion

== See also ==
- List of aviation accidents and incidents in Norway
- List of disasters in Sweden by death toll
- List of disasters in Finland by death toll
