= List of disasters in Finland by death toll =

Map showing the regions of Finland

This list of Finnish disasters by death toll includes major disasters (excluding acts of war) that occurred on Finnish soil (including Åland) or involved Finnish citizens, in a definable incident, where the loss of life was 10 or more.

== 100 or more deaths ==
Fatalities	Year	Article	Type	Location	Comments
150,000	1866–1868	Finnish famine of 1866–1868	Famine	Nationwide	
140,000	1695–1697	Great Famine of 1695–1697	Famine	Nationwide	
~20,000	1918–1919	Spanish flu	Pandemic	Nationwide	
15,000-20,000	1710–1711	Great Northern War plague outbreak	Epidemic	Nationwide	
11,466	2020–2021	COVID-19 pandemic in Finland	Pandemic	Nationwide	
279	1915–1916	Tampere typhoid epidemic 1916	Epidemic	Tampere, Pirkanmaa	
138	1929	SS Kuru	Shipwreck	Näsijärvi, Tampere, Pirkanmaa	

== 10 to 99 deaths ==
Fatalities	Year	Article	Type	Location	Comments
60-80	1941	1941 Katajanokka explosion	Explosion	Katajanokka, Helsinki, Uusimaa	Some believe caused by sabotage
53	1925	Finnish torpedo boat S2	Shipwreck	Offshore of Pori, Satakunta	
40	1976	Lapua Cartridge Factory explosion	Explosion	Lapua, South Ostrobothnia	
39	1940	Turenki rail accident	Train collision	Janakkala, Kanta-Häme	
38	1892	Kruunuvuorenselkä disaster	Ship collision	Kruunuvuorenselkä, Uusimaa	
34	1913	SS Vestkusten	Shipwreck	Kvarken	
34	1934	SS Louhi	Shipwreck	Suvasvesi, Northern Savo	
32	1920	Säkkijärvi boat disaster	Boat disaster	Säkkijärvi, South Karelia	
31	1940	Iittala train disaster	Train collision	Hämeenlinna, Kanta-Häme	
31	1966	Lapinlahti municipal home fire	Building fire	Lapinlahti, North Savo	
28	1921	SS Kustavi	Shipwreck	Hanko, Uusimaa	
28	1964	Finnish transport K-8	Shipwreck	Port of Rauma, Satakunta	
27	1979	Virrat nursing home fire	Building fire	Virrat, Pirkanmaa	
26	1942	Ähtäri train accident	Train derailment	Ähtäri, South Ostrobothnia	
26	1957	Kuurila train disaster	Train collision	Kalvola, Kanta-Häme	
25	1948	Kaljaasi Verna	Shipwreck	Offshore of Geta, Åland	
25	1961	Aero Flight 311	Plane crash	Korsholm, Ostrobothnia	
24	1924	Tiutinen II	Shipwreck	Off of Tiutinen, Kymenlaakso	
23	2004	Konginkangas bus disaster	Bus accident	Konginkangas, Central Finland	
22	1969	Aero Flight 217	Plane crash	Jomala, Åland	
20	1927	Imatra cinema fire	Building fire	Tampere, Pirkanmaa	
20	1942	Kausala train accident	Train collision	Kausala, Päijät-Häme	
19	1947	Rauma explosion	Explosion	Rauma, Satakunta	
18	1874	SS Österbotten	Ship fire	Near Reposaari, Satakunta	
18	1903	Sinking of Aino	Shipwreck	Pyhäjärvi, South Karelia	
17	1940	Hirvensalo bus crash	Bus accident	Hirvensalo, Turku, Southwest Finland	
16	1945	Tornio explosion	Explosion	Tornio, Lapland	
16	1959	1959 Köyliö prison fire	Building fire (Arson)	Köyliö, Satakunta	
16	1972	Sinking of Nostaja	Shipwreck	Offshore of Pietarsaari, Ostrobothnia	
15	1829	Juva church stampede	Crowd crush	Juva, South Savo	
15	1938	Rauha train accident	Train collision	Lappeenranta, South Karelia	
15	1949	SS Carl von Linne	Shipwreck	Offshore of Hanko, Uusimaa	
15	1956	Kivisalmi bus accident	Bus crash	Kivisalmi, Central Finland	
15	1959	Paalasmaa boat accident	Boat accident	Paalasmaa, North Karelia	
15	1978	1978 Finnish Air Force DC-3 crash	Plane crash	Siilinjärvi, North Savo	
14	1760	Kuopio church stampede	Crowd crush	Kuopio, North Savo	
14	1912	Sinking of Hermes	Shipwreck	Kvarken	
14	1940	Putikko train accident	Train collision	Savonlinna, South Savo	
14	1979	Sinking of MS Malmi	Shipwreck	Baltic Sea	
12	1933	Sinking of Parkki Plus	Shipwreck	Offshore of Mariehamn, Åland	
12	1937	Vallisaari explosion	Explosion	Vallisaari, Uusimaa	
12	1944	Onttola level crossing accident	Level crossing accident	Onttola, North Karelia	
12	1974	Laukaa bus accident	Bus crash	Laukaa, Central Finland	
11-13	1937	SS Turisti	Shipwreck	Lake Saimaa, South Savo	
11	1922	Virolahti boat disaster	Shipwreck	Virolahti, Kymenlaakso	
11	1945	Utti explosion	Explosion	Utti, Kymenlaakso	
11	1968	MS Irma	Shipwreck	Bothnian Sea north of Åland	
11	2008	Kauhajoki school shooting	Mass murder	Kauhajoki, South Ostrobothnia	
10	1813	Lammi church stampede	Crowd crush	Lammi, Kanta-Häme	
10	1918	Martinkylä train accident	Train collision	Martinkylä, Uusimaa	
10	1921	Sinking of Kuunari Rickhard	Shipwreck	Baltic Sea	
10	1943	Kuivaniemi train accident	Train collision	Kuivaniemi, North Ostrobothnia	
10	1947	SS Park Victory	Shipwreck	Utö, Southwest Finland	
10	1963	Typpi Oy explosion	Explosion	Oulu, North Ostrobothnia	
10	1978	Viikinki disaster	Shipwreck	Offshore of Hanko, Uusimaa	
10 (Finns)	1994	Sinking of MS Estonia	Shipwreck	Baltic Sea	
10	1998	Jyväskylä rail accident	Train derailment	Jyväskylä, Central Finland	

== Gallery ==
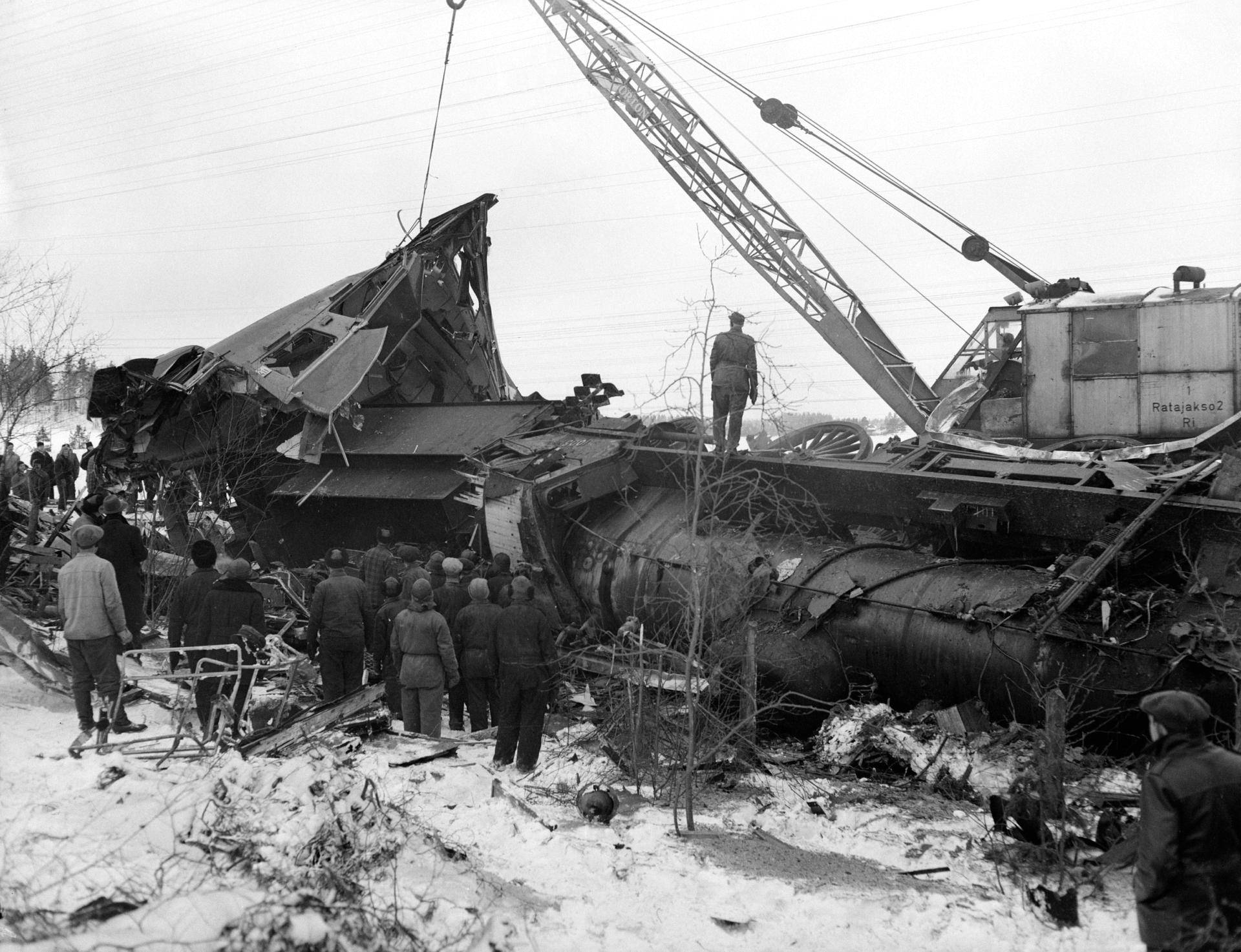
Kuurila train disaster

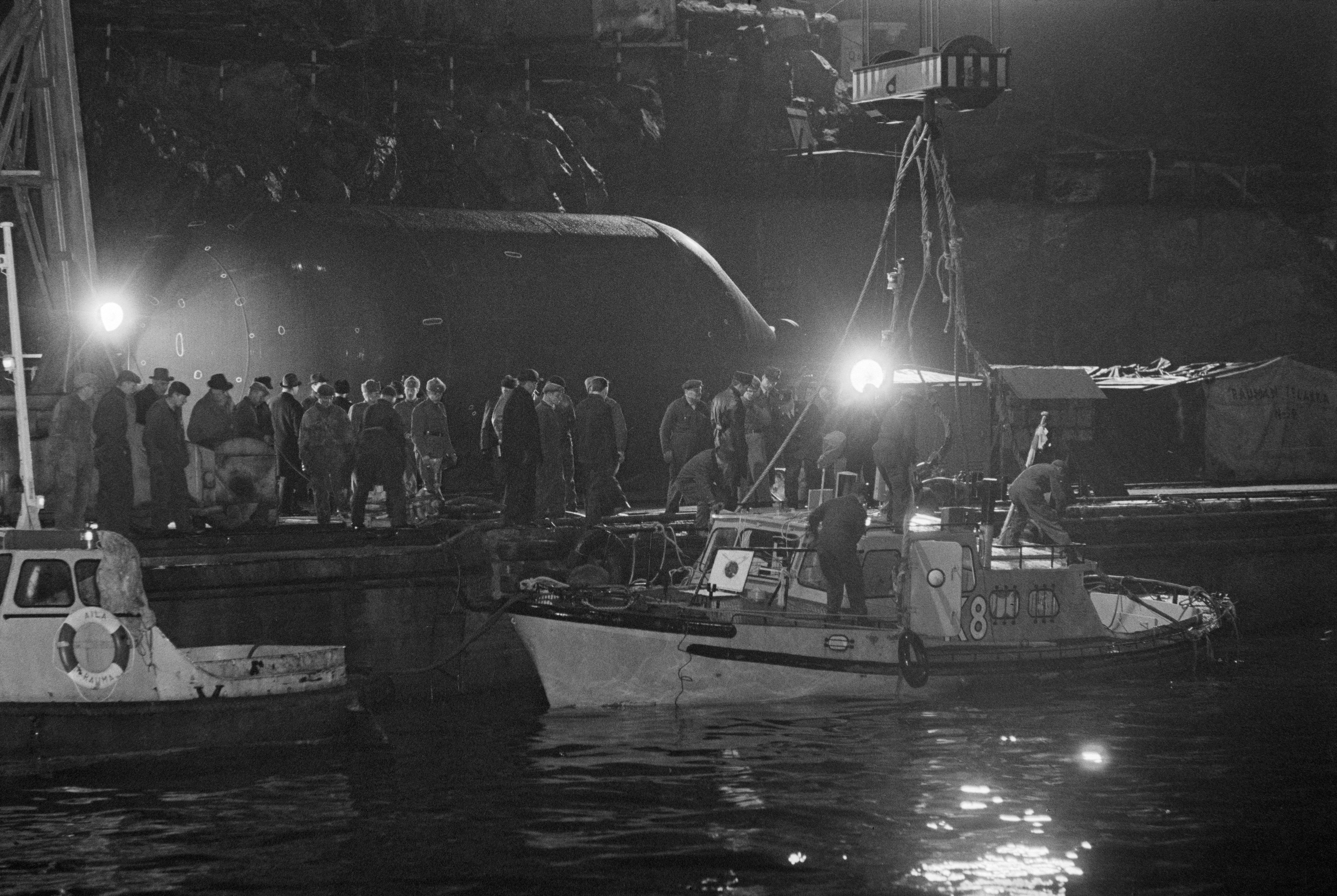
Sinking of the Finnish transport K-8

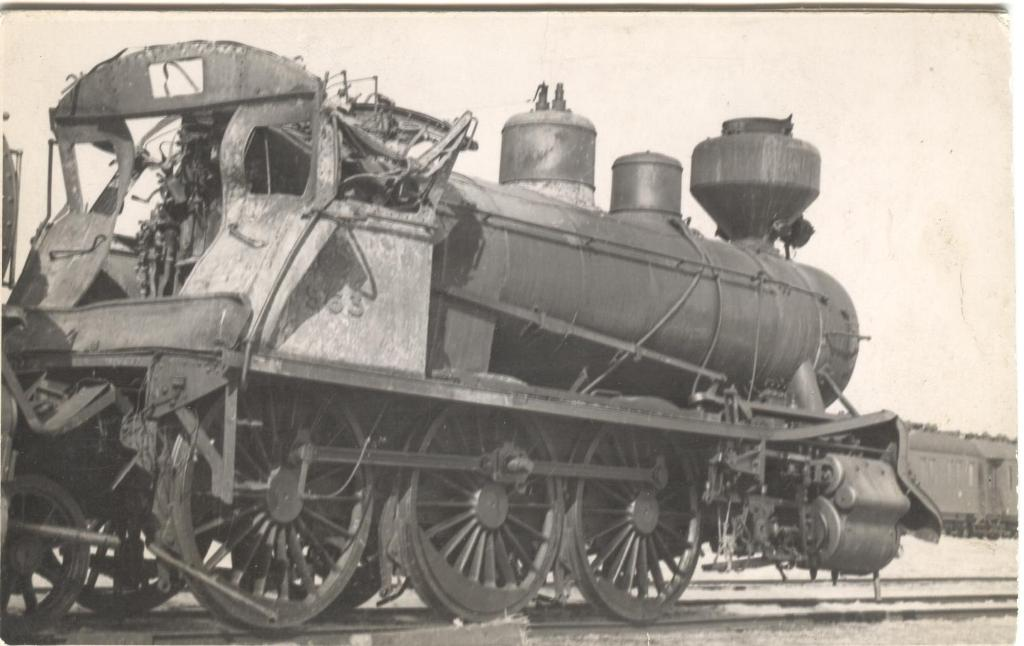
Iittala train accident

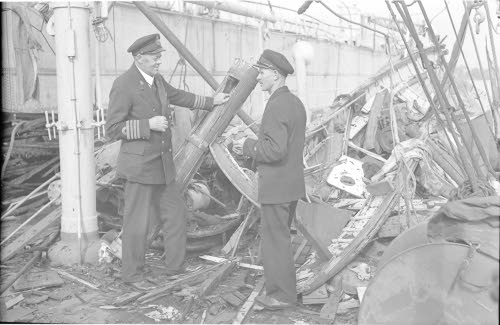
1941 Katajanokka explosion

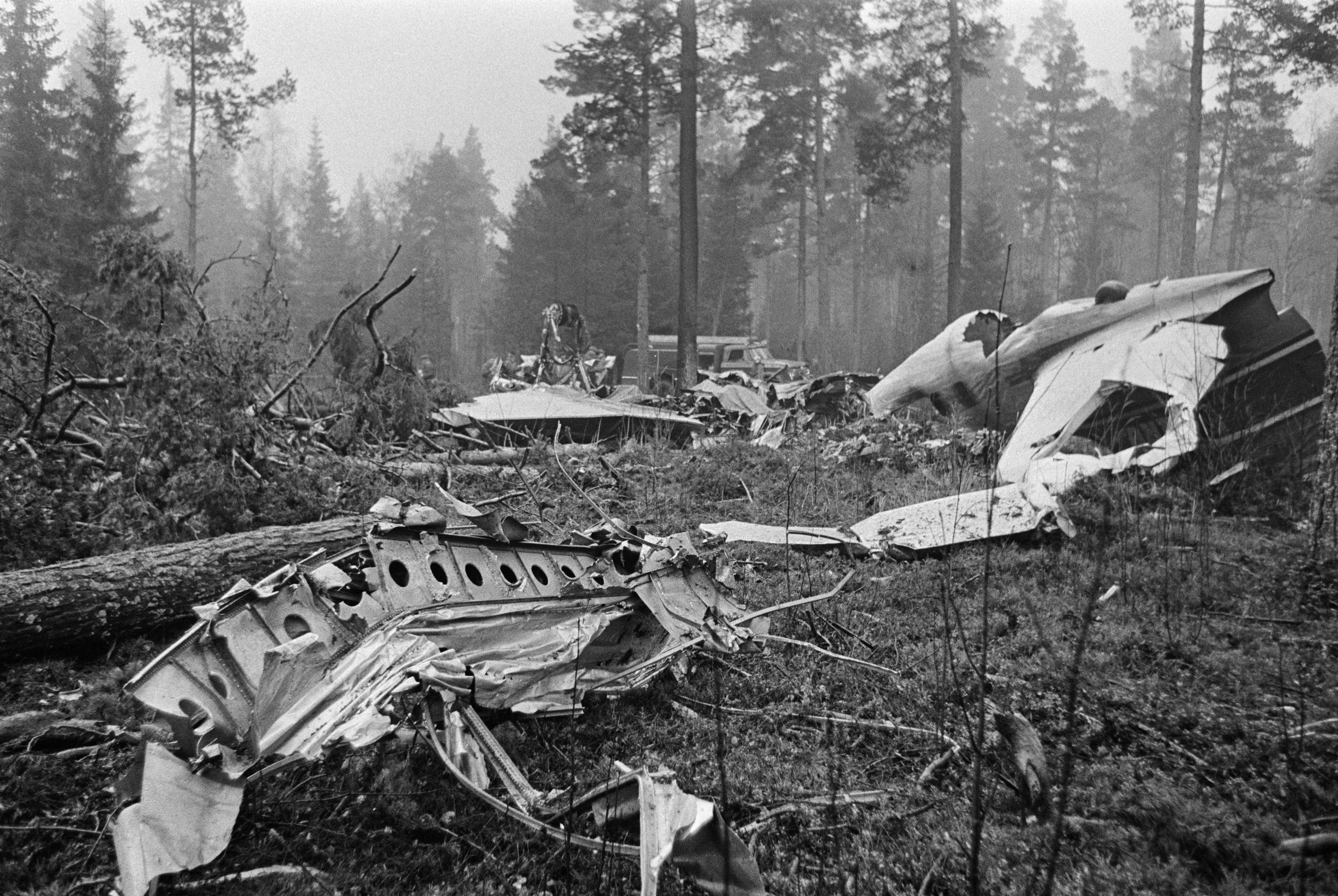
Aero Flight 217

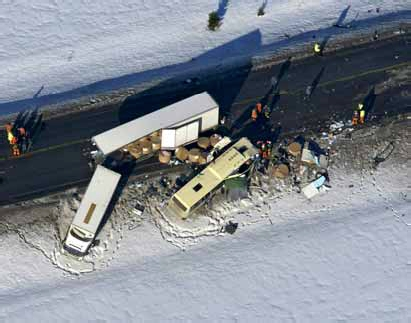
Konginkangas bus disaster

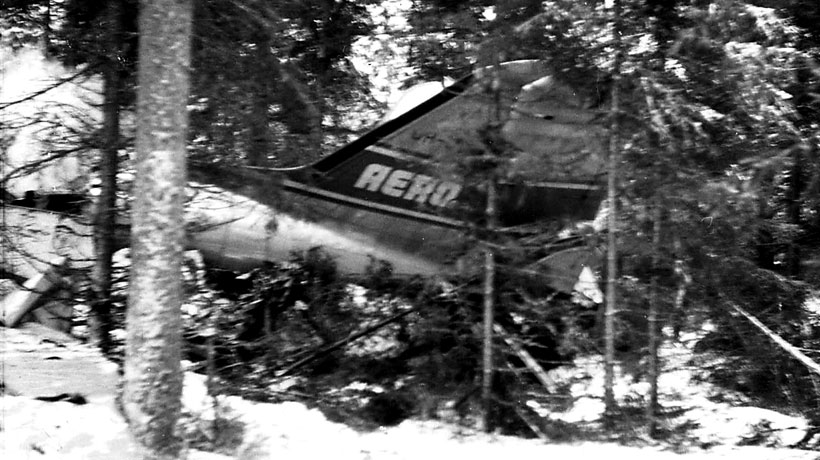
Aero Flight 311

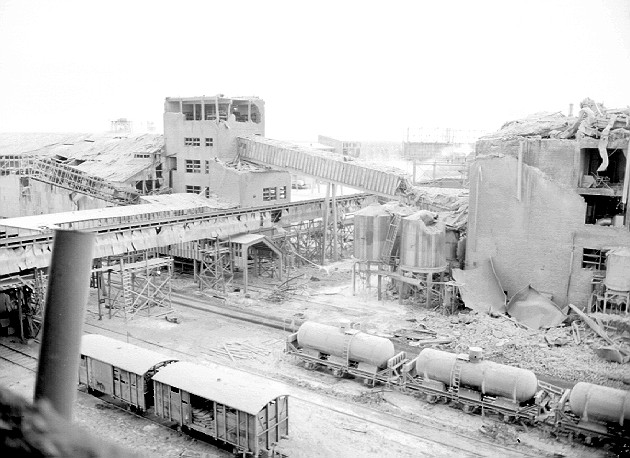
Typpi Oy explosion

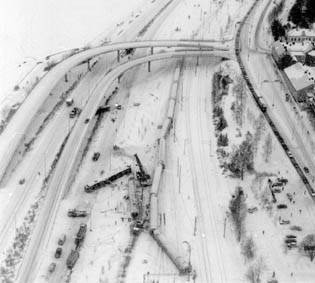
Jyväskylä rail accident

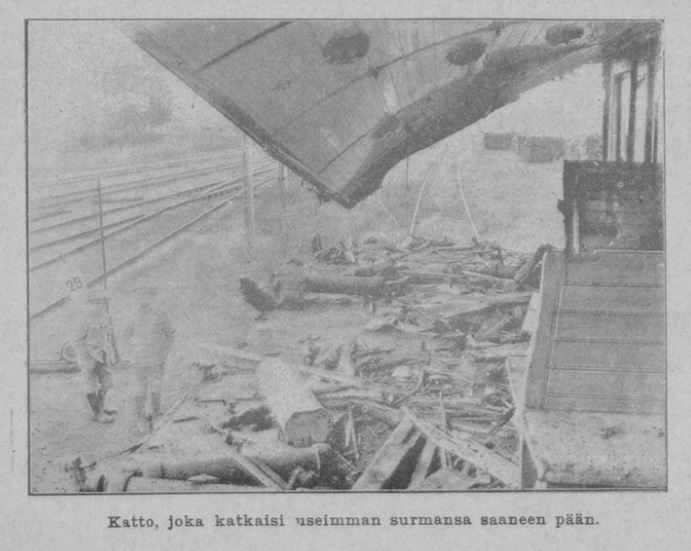
Martinkylä train accident

== See also ==
- List of disasters in Sweden by death toll
- List of disasters in Norway by death toll
