= Suuri-Onkamo =

Lake in Finland

- Location within Finland
- Coordinates: 62.326°N 30.010°E
- Type: Lake
- Basin countries: Finland
- Surface area: 32.107 km^{2} (12.397 sq mi)
- Average depth: 3.61 m (11.8 ft)
- Max. depth: 9.4 m (31 ft)
- Water volume: 0.114 km^{3} (92,000 acre⋅ft)
- Shore length^{1}: 87.83 km (54.58 mi)
- Surface elevation: 77 m (253 ft)
- Frozen: December–April
- Islands: Pyhäsaari
- ^{1} Shore length is not a well-defined measure.

Suuri-Onkamo is a medium-sized lake in the Vuoksi main catchment area in southern Finland. It is located in the North Karelia region. It is situated about 20 kilometer from the border with Russia. The lake is separated from another lake Pieni-Onkamo with nice esker called Sintsi. Third medium-sized lake near by is Särkijärvi. It has been said that compared to other Finnish lakes Suuri-Onkamo has different kind of climate, which comes from the lake Ladoga in the Russian side of the border.

== See also ==
- List of lakes in Finland
