= 2010 Helsinki Central Station accident =

Rail accident in Finland

Coordinates: 60°10′19″N 24°56′29″E

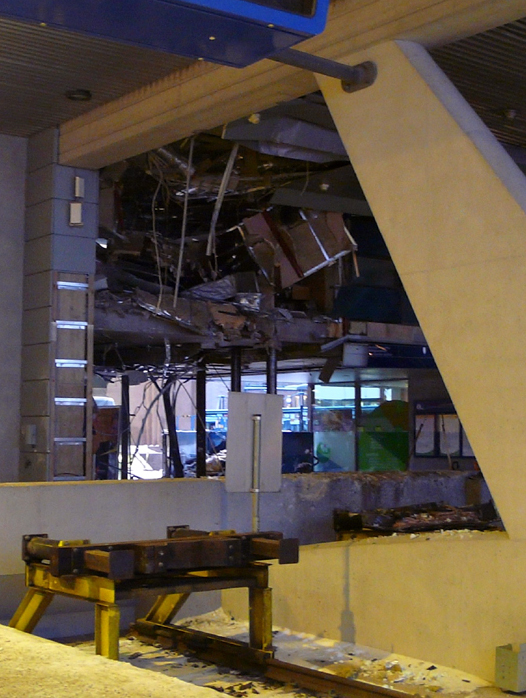
Damaged hotel building after the accident

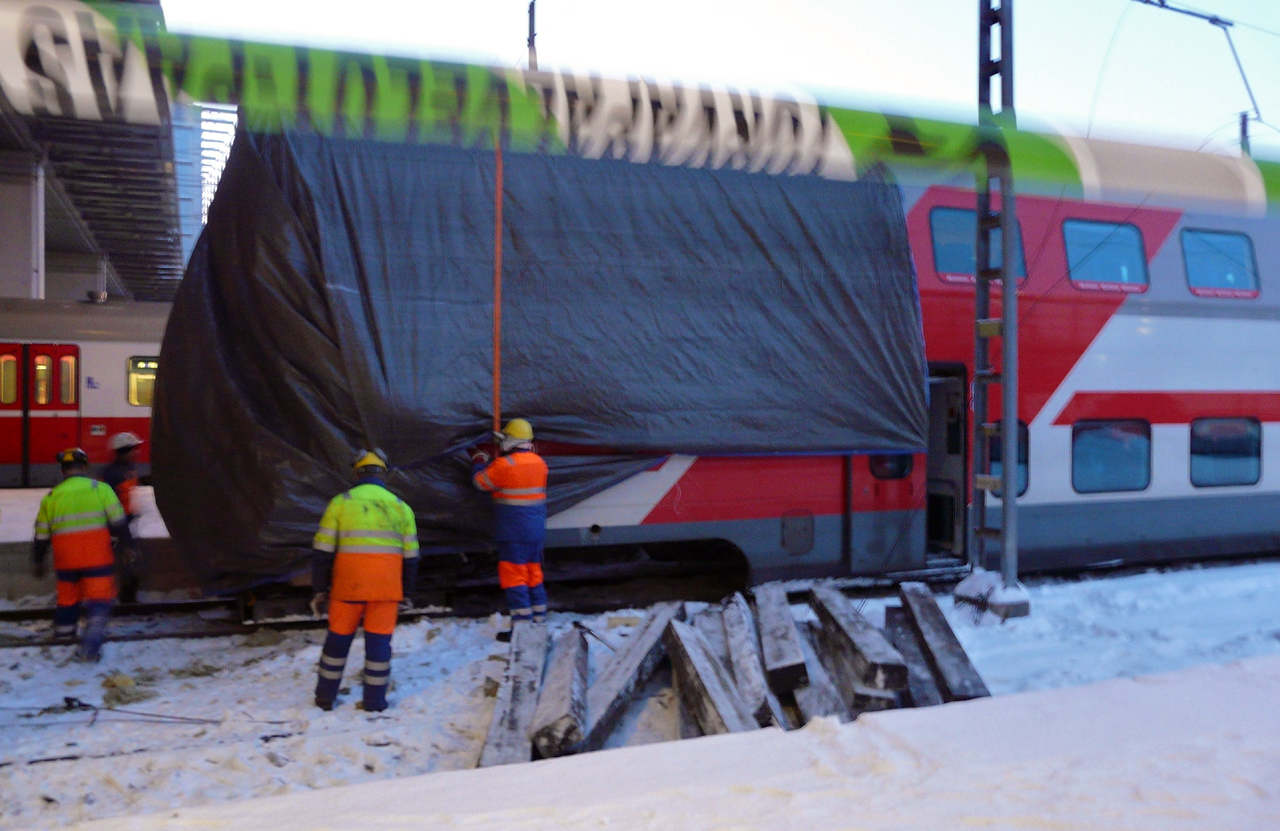
Railway workers clearing up the wreckage of the accident train on 5 January 2010

On 4 January 2010 at the Helsinki Central Station, four empty passenger carriages overran the buffers of platform 13. The carriages had broken free of their train during a shunting manoeuvre and ran under gravity down the gentle hill from Linnunlaulu before being diverting into an empty platform and impacting the buffers at 20–30 kilometres per hour.

The eight-carriage train arriving from the depot had been due to form the 08:12 departure running from Helsinki to Kajaani, through central Finland via Lahti and Kuopio. The formation which broke away consisted of three double-decker "Intercity 2" carriages, followed by a single-decker restaurant car. The runaway carriages were quickly detected and deliberately routed into one of the shorter commuter platforms (fitted with large concrete barriers beyond the buffers) in order to minimise damage to the main station area. Passengers aboard an adjacent commuter train waiting to depart were ordered to leave their train and run away from the area and announcements were made over the station's loudspeaker system. The first carriage of the four runaway cars mounted the concrete barrier. Members of the public in an Ernst & Young office beyond the end of the platform and those in the Holiday Inn hotel above the platforms all escaped without injury. The first carriage then struck the hotel's conference room, causing extensive damage to the room. The conductor aboard the train as it came in sustained light injuries to their arm, with nobody else injured.

Services had resumed at a reduced level by the afternoon following repairs to damage to the overhead line. The Finnish Accident Investigation Board announced that they would proceed with an investigation into why the brakes had not automatically applied. A restaurant car and one of the passenger carriages were towed to the depot by a diesel locomotive during the course of the night, after which the front carriage was partially dragged back out of the hotel building. The building that had taken the force of the crash was deemed to be structurally sound.

On 18 January 2010 the Finnish Accident Investigation Board released their interim report which concluded that the incident had been caused by a combination of bad weather and then human error. Initially, snow and ice had caused the front carriages to detach from the rest of the train; followed by the guard having released the brakes manually—not realizing that the two halves of the train were no longer coupled.
