= Hirvensalo bus crash =

1940 bus crash in Finland

- Native name: Hirvensalon linja-autoturma
- Date: 25 May 1940
- Time: 12:40 PM, EET
- Location: Hirvensalo, Maaria, Finland
- Type: Bus accident
- Deaths: 17
- Injuries: 19

On 25 May 1940, a bus accident in Hirvensalo, southwest of Turku, Finland killed 17 people and injured 19. The bus skidded off the road and into the sea after its brakes failed. It was the deadliest bus crash in Finnish history until the 2004 Konginkangas bus disaster, which killed 25 people.

== Disaster ==
An Auto-Saaristo Ltd. Chevrolet bus left the main portion of Turku heading for Kakskerta at 12:00 PM being driven by a bus driver with 16 years of experience. The bus was built with 12 seats and a capacity of 24 people, but on this occasion was well over capacity carrying 36 passengers. The bus took the ferry from Turku to Hirvensalo island, and then began taking the 5 km (3.1 mi) road towards Satava. The road leading to the ferry descended into a long, steep hill to the shore. When the driver started to brake on the hill, the brakes failed. As the bus was barrelling uncontrollably down the hill towards the sea, two people, a schoolgirl and a woman, jumped out of the bus. The bus crashed through the railing of the pier for the ferry between Hirvensalo and Satava and fell into the sea.

== Rescue efforts ==
Of those onboard, 17 people, including the driver, escaped the bus and were rescued by a boat. The bus windows blocked many from being able to escape. When rescuers used iron bars and axes to make a hole in the bus roof, the bodies of 16 people and a dog floated to the surface. The dog ultimately survived, but all 16 people died despite artificial respiration attempts. One of the initial people rescued, a 3 year-old boy, later died in hospital, making him the 17th victim.

== See also ==
- Beaune coach crash
- Dunderland Valley bus crash
- Måbødalen bus accident
