= Røværsholmen Lighthouse =

Coastal lighthouse in Norway

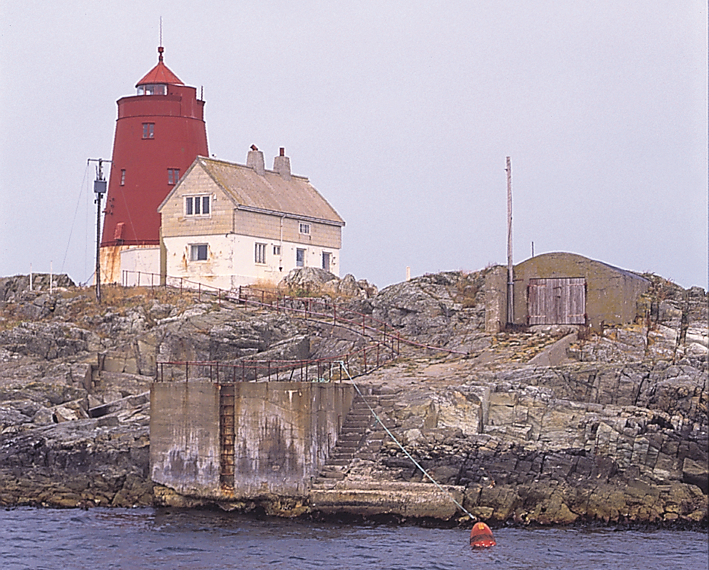
- View of Røværsholmen lighthouse.
- Location: Røvær; Rogaland; Norway
- Coordinates: 59°27′06″N 5°04′10″E

Tower
- Constructed: 1892
- Construction: stone tower
- Automated: 1975
- Height: 16 m (52 ft)
- Shape: massive tapered cylindrical tower with balcony and lantern
- Markings: red tower and lantern, white basement
- Heritage: cultural property

Light
- Focal height: 22.5 m (74 ft)
- Intensity: 57,000 candela
- Range: 14.5 nmi (26.9 km; 16.7 mi)
- Characteristic: Iso WRG 4s

Røværsholmen Lighthouse (Norwegian: Røværsholmen fyr) is a coastal lighthouse located in the Røvær islands in Haugesund Municipality in Rogaland county, Norway.

== History ==
The lighthouse was established in 1892 and automated in 1975. The lighthouse was listed as a protected site in 1998.

The lighthouse sits about 12 kilometres (7.5 mi) northwest of the town of Haugesund. The 15.5-metre (51 ft) tall, massive, round, stone tower is painted red. A two-story lighthouse keeper's house adjoins the lighthouse. The lower story of the house is stone and the upper story is wood. At the top of the lighthouse, at an elevation of 22.5 metres (74 ft) above sea level, there is a white, red, or green light (depending on direction) that emits an isophase pattern of two seconds on and two seconds off. The 57,000-candela intensity light can be seen for up to 14.5 nautical miles (26.9 km; 16.7 mi) away.

== See also ==
- Lighthouses in Norway
- List of lighthouses in Norway
