= SS Skoghaug =

Sunken cargo ship

History
- Name: SS Livingstone II (1930); SS Sea Valour (1930-1946); SS Skoghaug (1946-1947)
- Owner: C. Mathiesen, Bergen (1930); Dover Navigation Co. Ltd., Dover (1930-1946); Lindø Alf-Lindøs Rederi D/S A/S, Haugesund (1946-1947)
- Builder: Samuel Peter Austin & Son, Sunderland
- Yard number: 323
- Launched: 25 August 1930
- Completed: October 1930
- Fate: Exploded and sank on 25 December 1947

General characteristics
- Tonnage: 1,950 gross register tons (GRT); 1,124 net register tons (NRT)
- Length: 276 ft (84 m)
- Beam: 42.2 ft (12.9 m)
- Draught: 18.15 ft (5.53 m)
- Depth: 20.75 ft (6.32 m)
- Installed power: 224 nhp
- Propulsion: T3cyl (20.5, 34, 56 x 39in), 1 screw

SS Skoghaug was a Norwegian steam cargo ship, built in 1930. She exploded and sank in the North Sea off the coast of the Netherlands on Christmas Day, 1947. Only one of her 27 crew survived.

== Background ==
SS Skoghaug was built as SS Livingston II in 1930 by Austin S. P. & Son Ltd., at Sunderland, UK, with yard number 323. Her 224 n.h.p. 3-cylinder triple expansion engine was supplied by Clark George Ltd., drove a single shaft, 1 screw, and was capable of 10 knots. The ship measured 84.1 x 12.9 x 5.67 meters. She is listed as 1,950 tons or as 2099 grt.

The ship was named Livingston II briefly in 1930, then was sold and operated from 1930 to 1947 as SS Sea Valour. Sold again, in January 1947, to Lindø Alf-Lindøs Rederi D/S A/S, Haugesund, Norway, the vessel was renamed Skoghaug.

== Fate ==
Early on Christmas Day 1947, the ship exploded in the North Sea off North Holland. One crewman of 27 survived the disaster.

"The survivor, Fireman Arnt Roekka, told newsmen today that only five men got off in two lifeboats and four of these died of injuries or exposure. The other crewmen were either killed by the explosion or were pitched into towering waves.

"Roekka said he manned one lifeboat with two injured men. One soon succumbed and the other died some hours later before the boat struck a breakwater and capsized. A human chain of ten Dutchmen managed to pull Roekka out of the water.

"When the other boat reached the coast at Callantsoog its two occupants were dead tied to the boat to keep from being washed overboard."

Although a wartime mine was initially conjectured as the cause, examination of the wreck suggested a boiler explosion.
