= Røvær =

Island group in Rogaland, Norway

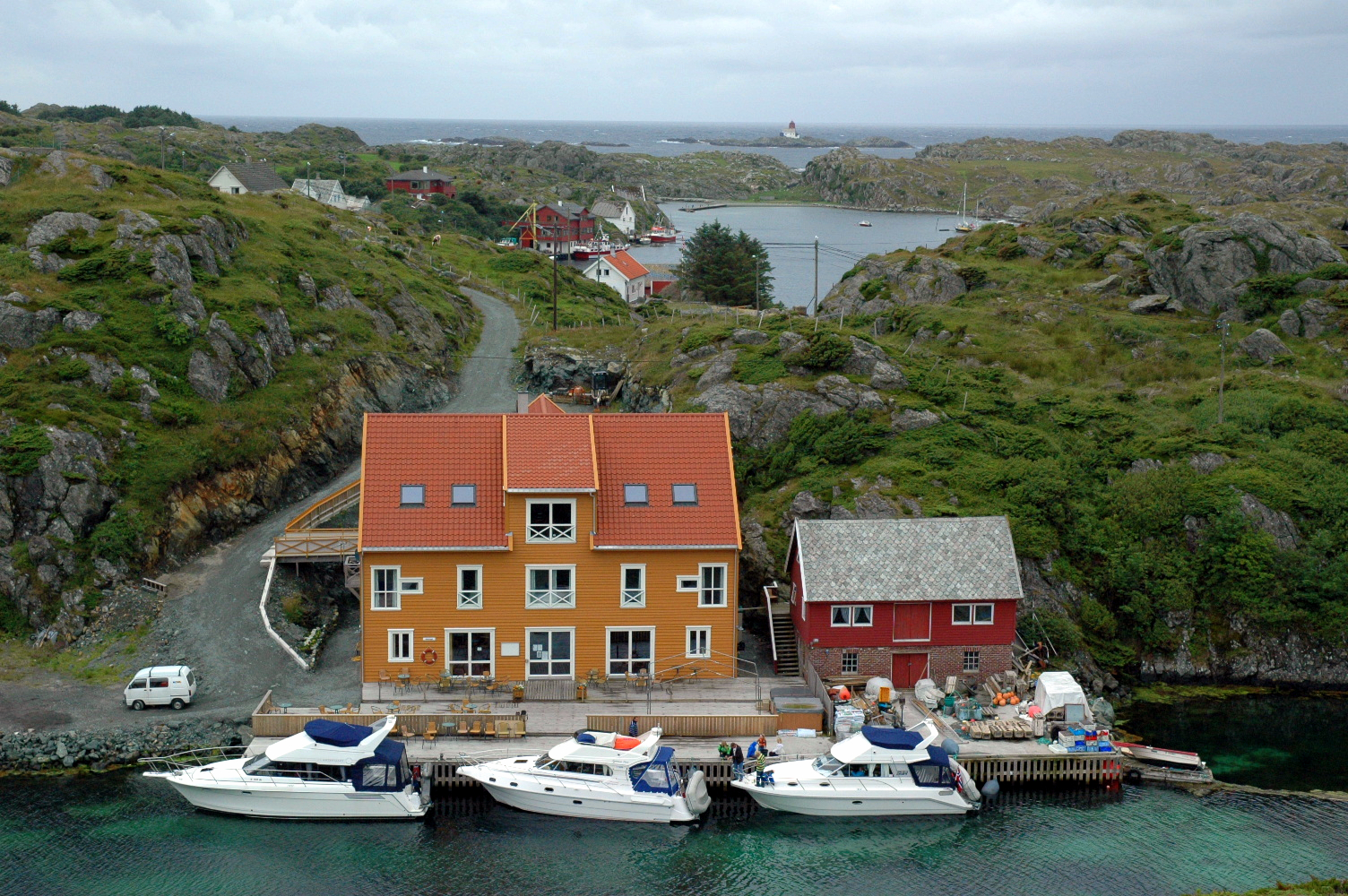
- Røvær Kulturhotell
- Interactive map of the island

Geography
- Location: Rogaland, Norway
- Coordinates: 59.44179°N 5.08236°E
- Area: 1.4 km^{2} (0.54 sq mi)

Administration
- Norway
- County: Rogaland
- Municipality: Haugesund Municipality

Demographics
- Population: 77 (2022)

Røvær is an island group in Haugesund Municipality in Rogaland county, Norway. The islands lie off the mainland shore about 10 kilometres (6.2 mi) northwest of the town of Haugesund. In 2022, there were about 77 residents living on the islands, with most living on the eastern shore of the main island of Røvær and the small island of Urd.

Regular express boat service connects Røvær, the neighboring island of Feøy, and the town of Haugesund. Most island residents also own a private boat and have a car parked in Haugesund that they use on the mainland. The ferry boats have the capacity to take one car on board; a direct route between Røvær and Haugesund takes 25 minutes each way.

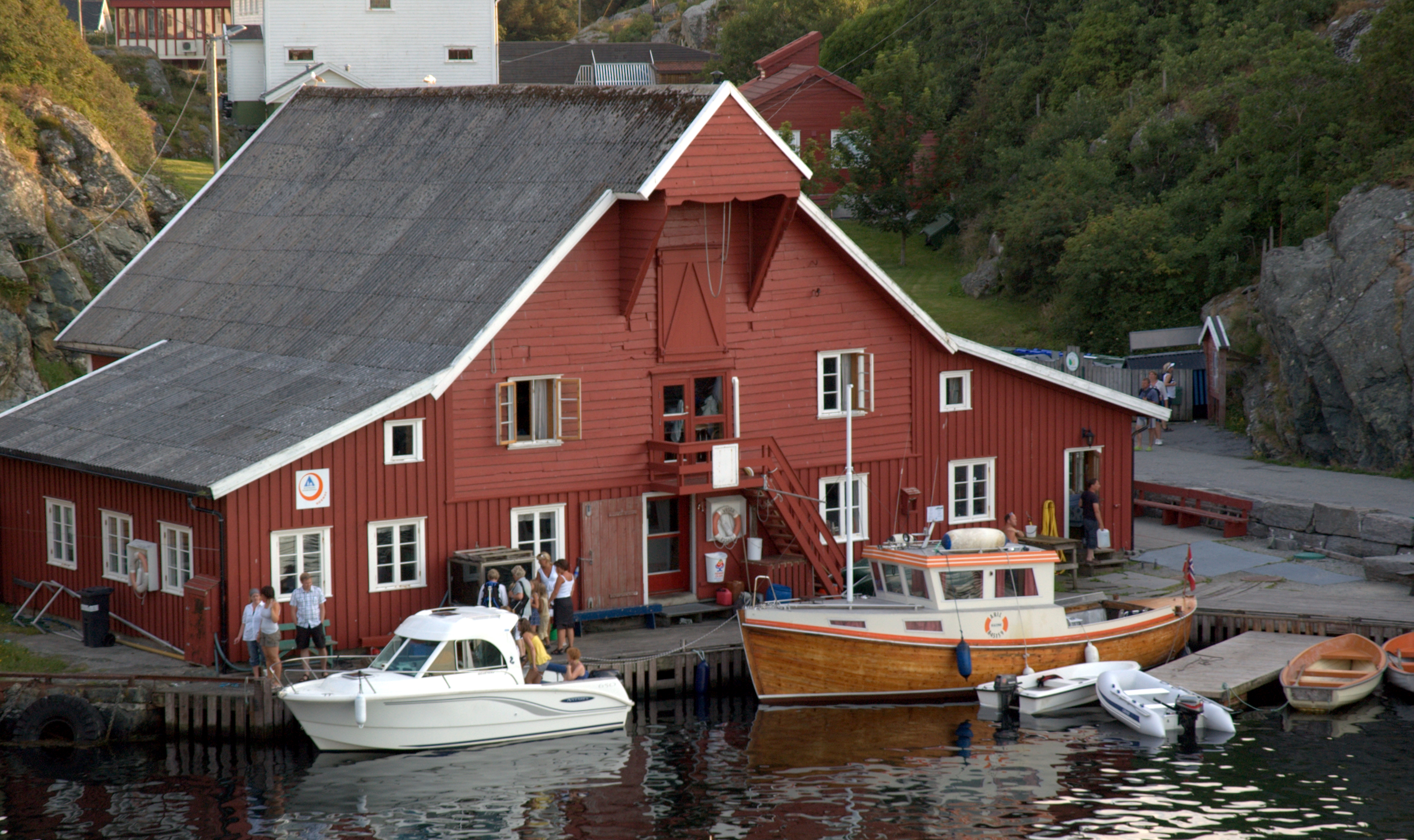
Røvær Sjøhus

The 1.4-square-kilometre (0.54 sq mi) Røvær islands have about 77 permanent residents (2022), as well as seasonal residents and visitors who rent vacation homes, stay at Røvær Seahouse (Røvær Sjøhus) or the newer Røvær Culture Hotel (Røvær Kulturhotell). The permanent residents who are not retired, support themselves principally through farming, fishing, employment at the express boat service, teaching at the island's local school, working at the salmon fish farm, or commute to work on the mainland.

During World War II, the island was occupied by German military forces, and there is still a concrete pillbox on Varden, the island's highest point.

== Climate ==
The weather can be nice in the summer (June to August) with temperatures between 15 and 27 °C (59 and 81 °F). Temperature in the winter time is around −5 to 10 °C (23 to 50 °F).

Climate data for Røvær (25 m, extremes 2011-2025)
Month	Jan	Feb	Mar	Apr	May	Jun	Jul	Aug	Sep	Oct	Nov	Dec	Year
Record high °C (°F)	9.8 (49.6)	9.8 (49.6)	14.2 (57.6)	19.3 (66.7)	26.6 (79.9)	26.8 (80.2)	28.8 (83.8)	25.4 (77.7)	25.6 (78.1)	19.3 (66.7)	15.0 (59.0)	11.6 (52.9)	28.8 (83.8)
Daily mean °C (°F)	3.7 (38.7)	2.7 (36.9)	3.6 (38.5)	6.1 (43.0)	8.9 (48.0)	11.6 (52.9)	14.3 (57.7)	15.2 (59.4)	13.2 (55.8)	9.8 (49.6)	6.8 (44.2)	4.4 (39.9)	8.4 (47.1)
Record low °C (°F)	−5.8 (21.6)	−10.0 (14.0)	−8.8 (16.2)	−1.9 (28.6)	1.0 (33.8)	5.5 (41.9)	8.7 (47.7)	8.2 (46.8)	5.5 (41.9)	1.1 (34.0)	−4.6 (23.7)	−6.5 (20.3)	−10.0 (14.0)
Source: yr.no/Norwegian Meteorological Institute

== Media gallery ==
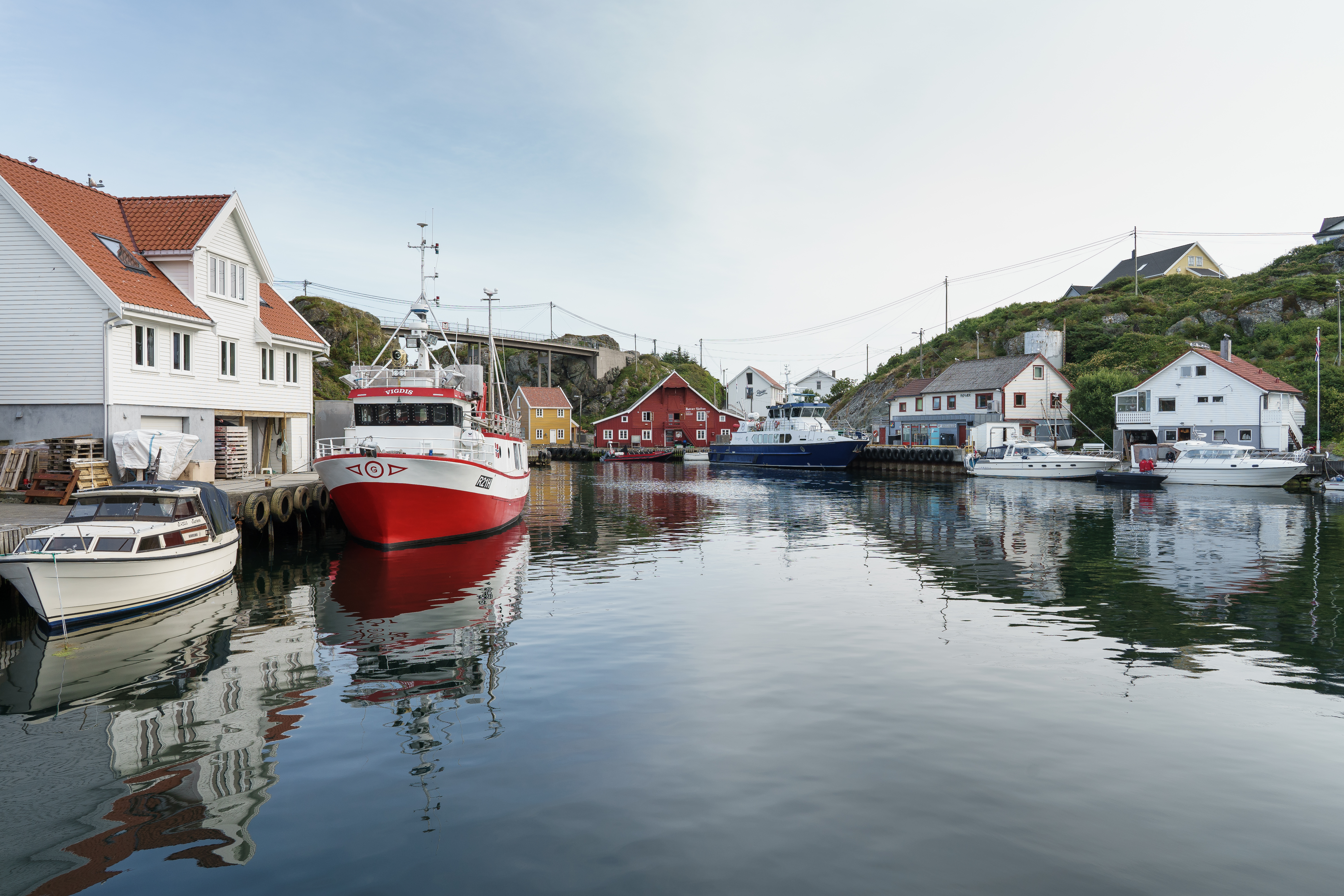
Sjøhus, ferry pier, shop / post office

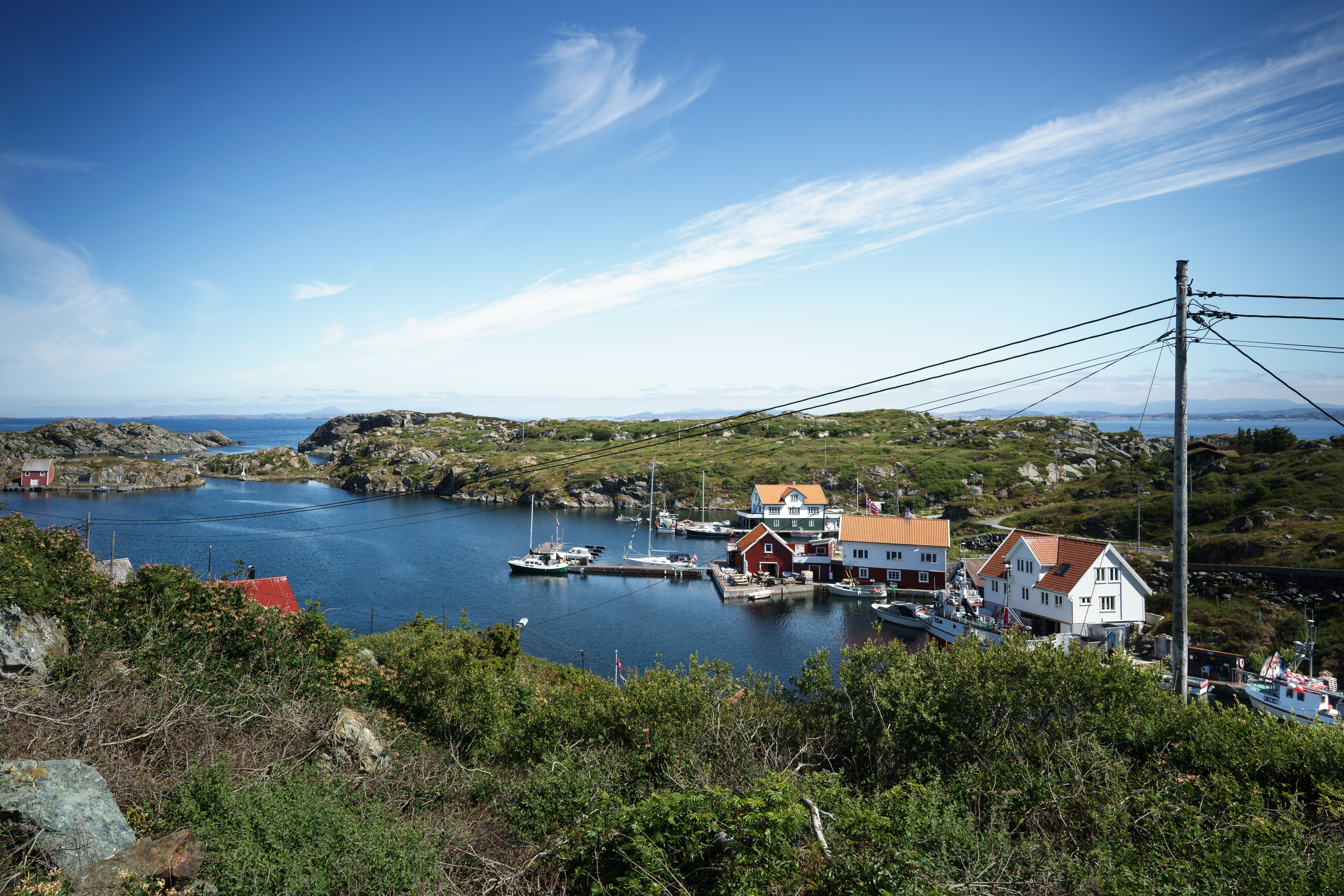
Mjørsund and Suggevågen

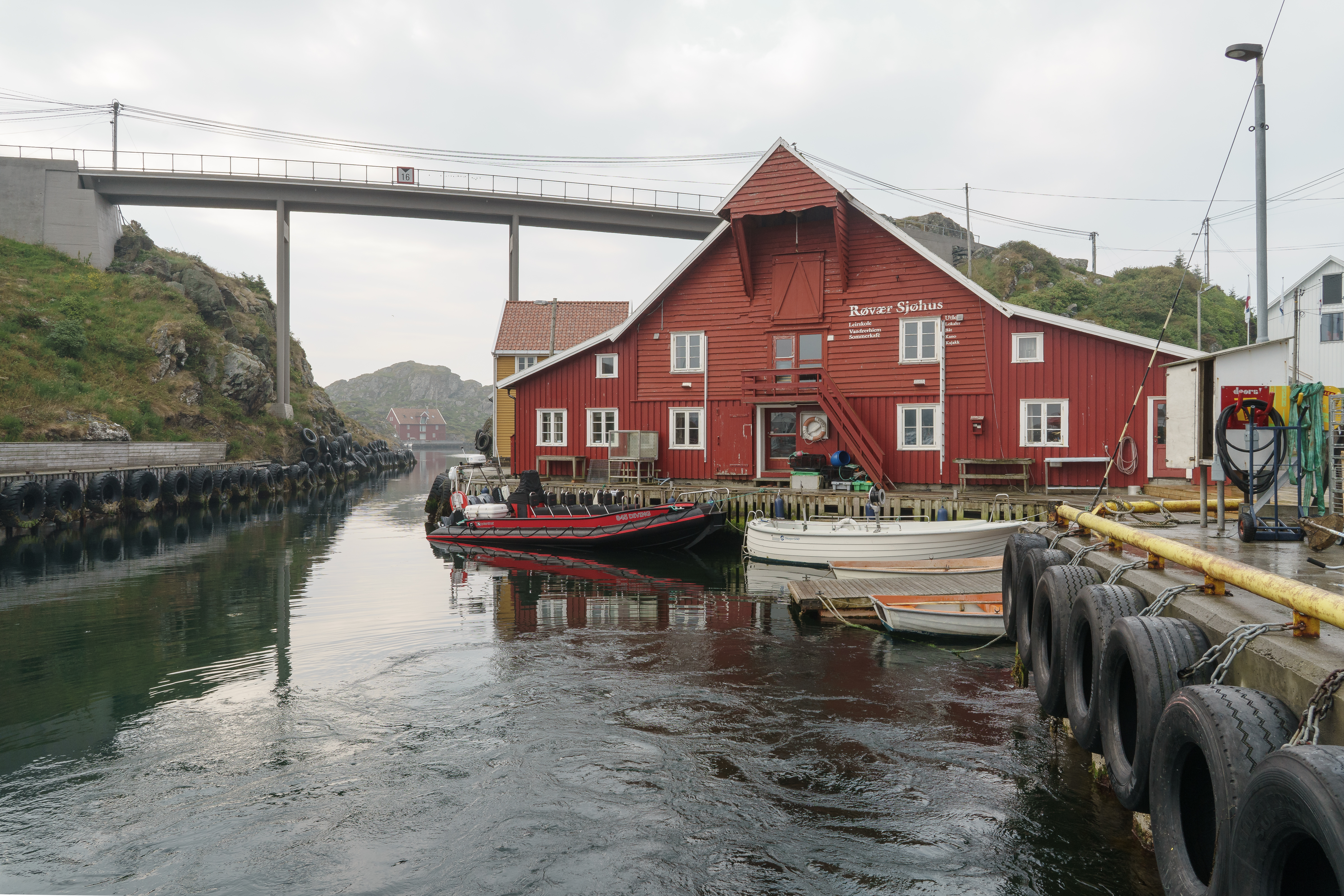
Sjøhus and canal

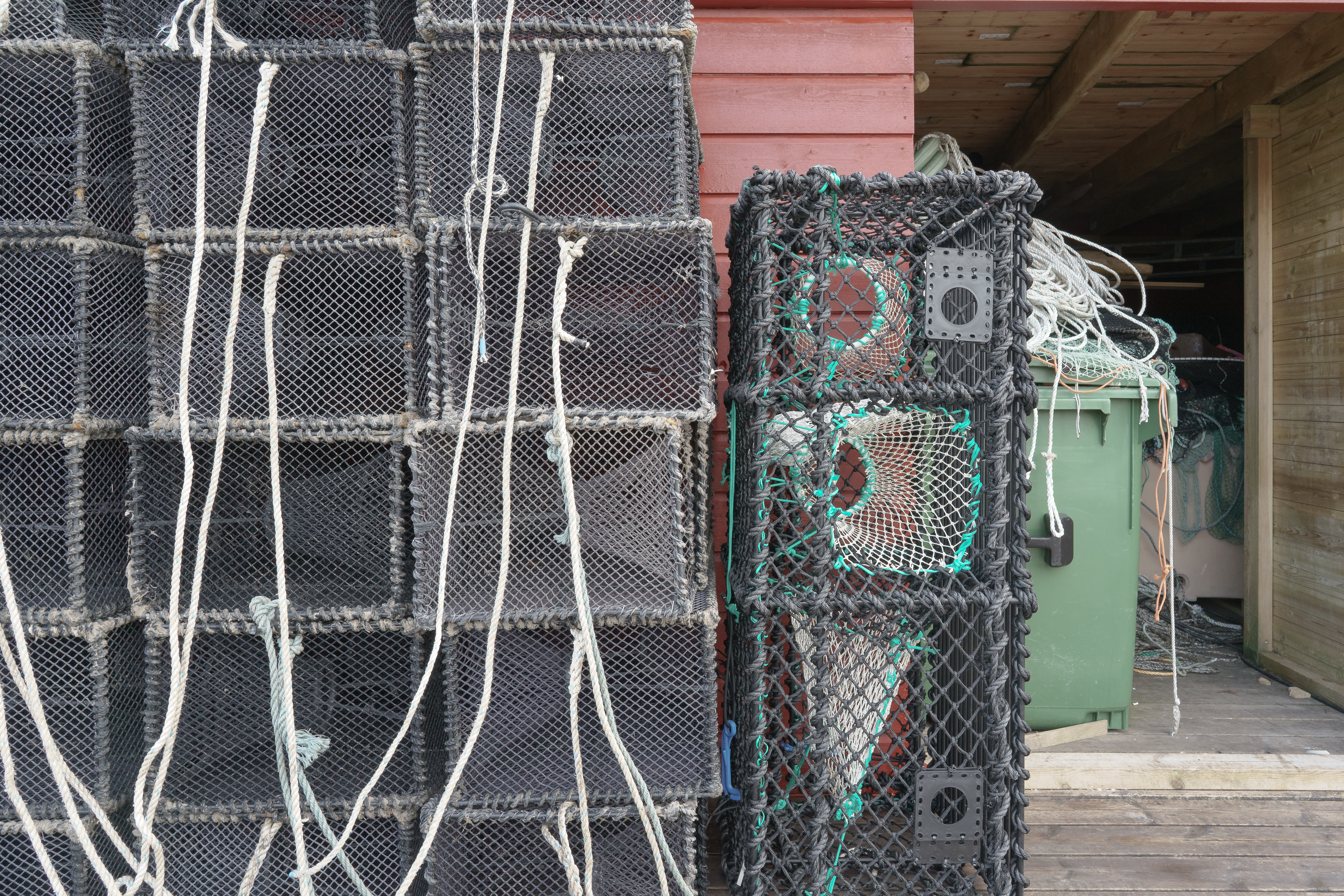
Crab creels

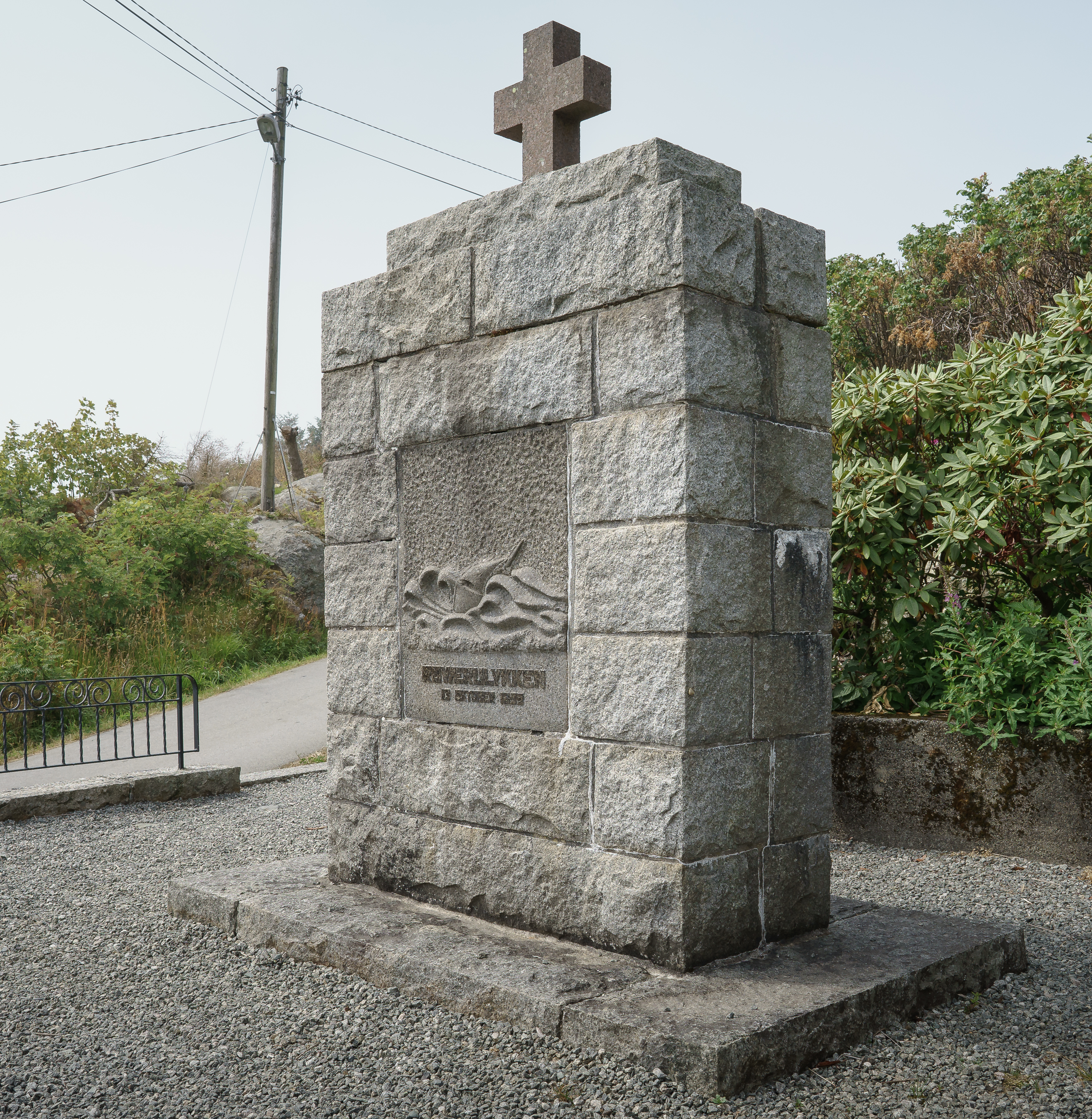
Memorial 1899

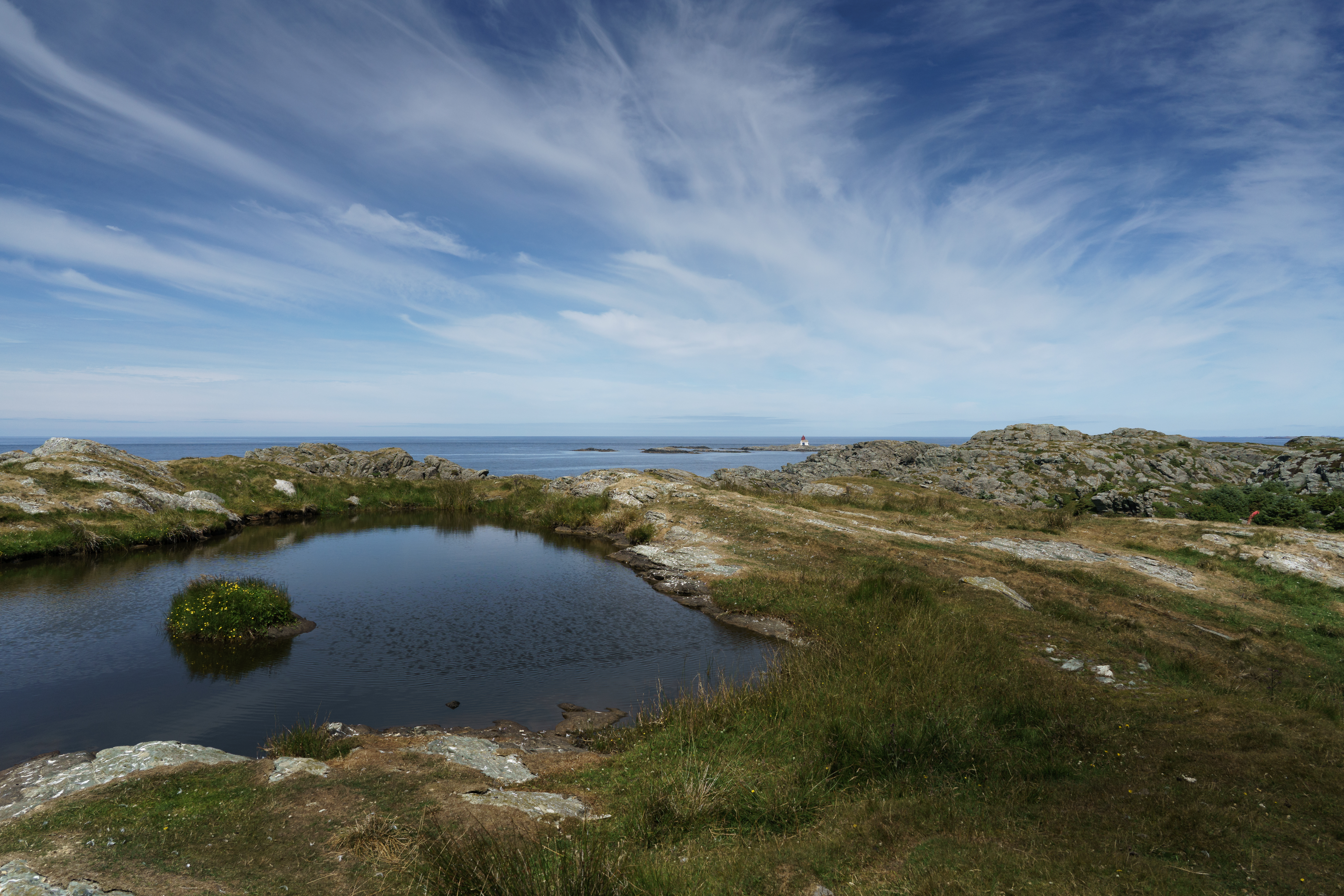
Blick zum Leuchtturm Røværsholmen

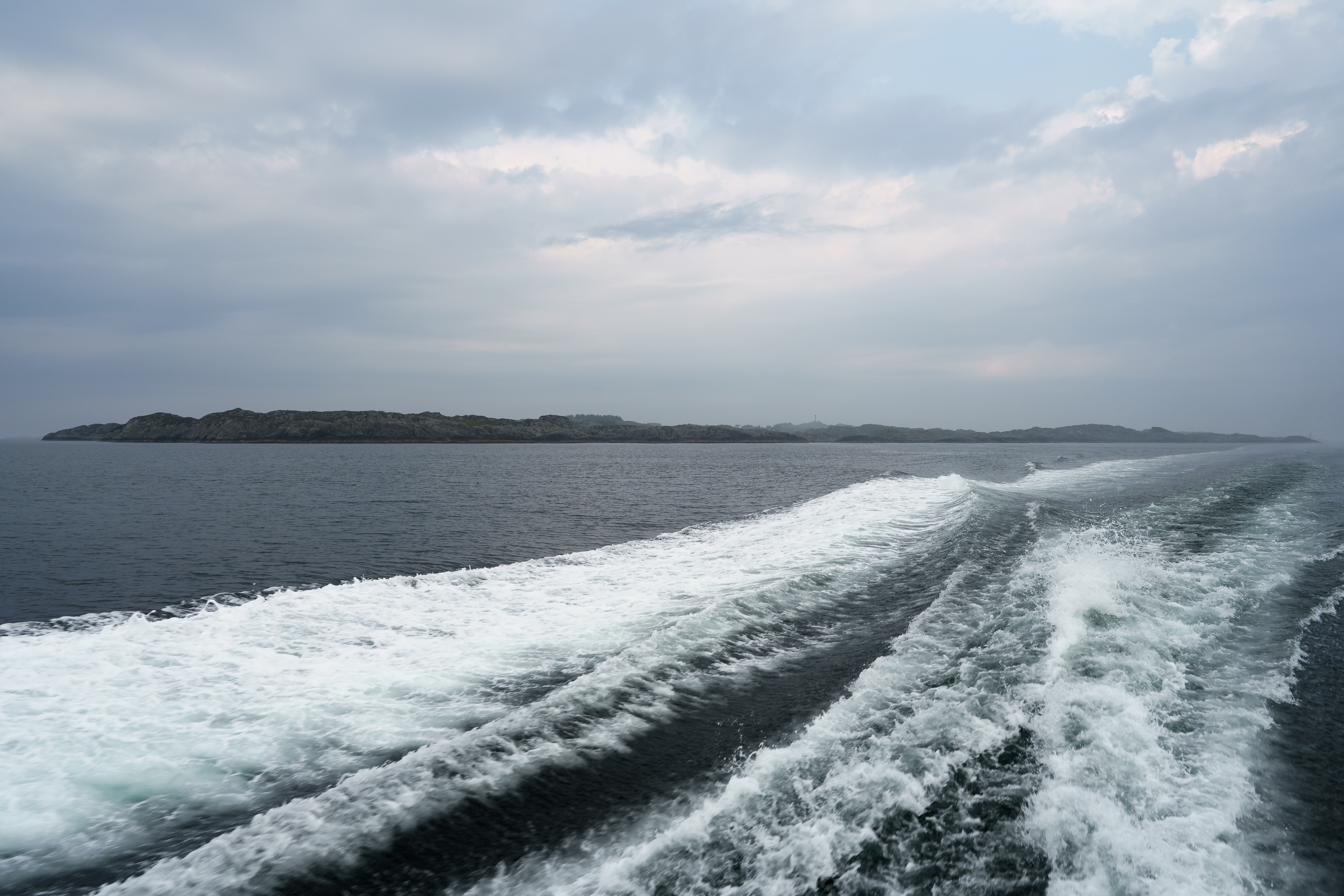
total view

== See also ==
- List of islands of Norway
