= MV Norse Variant =

Norwegian combined bulk and car carrier

Coordinates: 38°00′N 72°15′W

History

Norway
- Name: Norse Variant
- Owner: Odd Godager & Co.
- Port of registry: Oslo, Norway
- Builder: Uddevallavarvet AB, Uddevalla, Sweden
- Yard number: 267
- Launched: 26 October 1964
- Completed: March 1965
- Identification: IMO number: 6500222; Call sign: LNFC
- Fate: Sank, 22 March 1973

General characteristics
- Type: Combined bulk and car carrier
- Tonnage: 13,194 GT; 7,190 NT; 20,842 DWT
- Length: 541 ft 6 in (165.05 m)
- Beam: 70 ft 2 in (21.39 m)
- Draught: 40 ft 9 in (12.42 m)
- Propulsion: 9,000 bhp (6,711 kW) B&W 2SCSA 6-cylinder marine diesel engine

MV Norse Variant was a Norwegian combined bulk and car carrier, which sank off the coast of New Jersey during a storm on 22 March 1973.

== Ship history ==
The ship was constructed by the Uddevallavarvet AB shipyard at Uddevalla, Sweden, for Odd Godager & Co. of Oslo, and was delivered in March 1965. Norse Variant could carry 1,500 cars and sailed between Europe, the US east and west coasts, and Japan, with cars and bulk cargoes. She sailed from Newport News on 21 March 1973 with a cargo of coal bound for Glasgow and sank in a late winter storm the next day. The last radio message from the ship was received at 13:49 on 22 March. Of the crew of 30 only one man, the oiler Stein Gabrielsen, survived, having spent three days on rafts before being rescued by MT Mobile Lube. The incident was caused after sailing into the center of an extreme weather event along with the Anita. During the storm, deck cargo was displaced by water and a hatch cover was broken. The ship suddenly took on a large amount of water and sank before any evacuation could be completed. According to researchers, the incident was caused by a rogue wave event, which is also implicated in the loss of the Anita, which disappeared without a trace in the same storm.

Another Norwegian combined bulk and car carrier, MV Anita, which passed Cape Henry only an hour after Norse Variant, disappeared with its crew of 32. Nothing was ever found of this vessel.
