= Särkijärvi =

Lake in the country of Finland

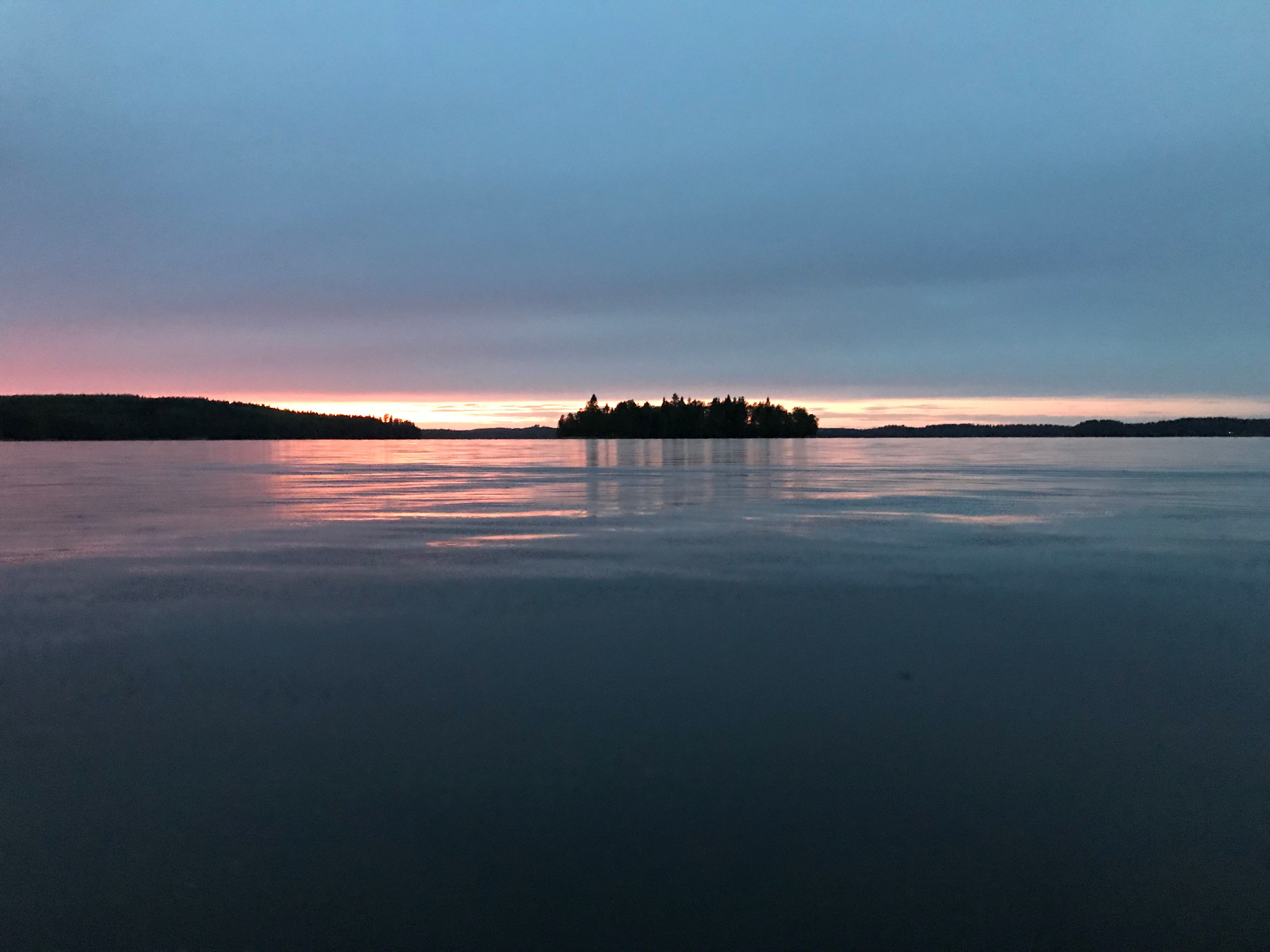
- Särkijärvi with rovesaari

- Location within Finland
- Coordinates: 62.3423°N 30.07814°E
- Primary outflows: Särkipuro, Nivanjoki to the lake Pieni-Onkamo
- Catchment area: Vuoksi
- Basin countries: Finland
- Surface area: 10.746 km^{2} (4.149 sq mi)
- Average depth: 7.38 m (24.2 ft)
- Max. depth: 20.8 m (68 ft)
- Water volume: 0.0793 km^{3} (64,300 acre⋅ft)
- Shore length^{1}: 25.2 km (15.7 mi)
- Surface elevation: 86.8 m (285 ft)
- Frozen: December–April
- Islands: Pyhäsaari
- ^{1} Shore length is not a well-defined measure.

Särkijärvi is a medium-sized lake in the Vuoksi main catchment area. It is located in the North Karelia region in Finland, close to border with Russia. There are 178 lakes with this name in Finland. This lake is the biggest of them.

== See also ==
- List of lakes in Finland
