= Safety Investigation Authority =

Finnish accident investigation authority

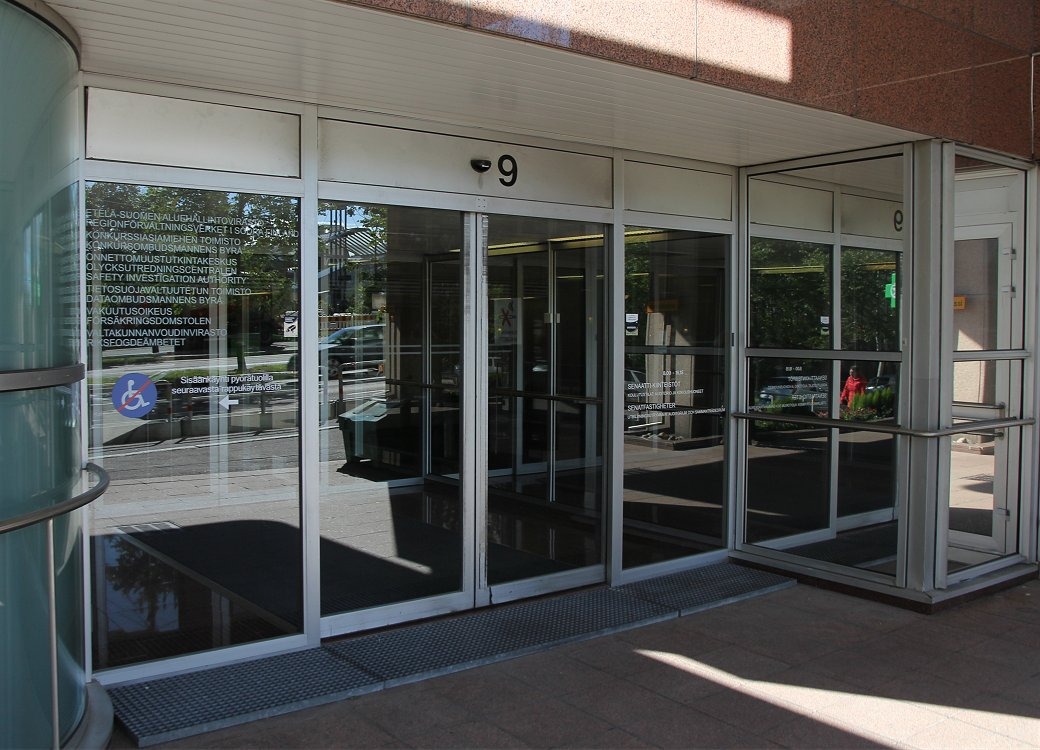
Head office of the Safety Investigation Authority of Finland

The Safety Investigation Authority of Finland (SIAF or SIA, Finnish: Onnettomuustutkintakeskus, lit. Accident Investigation Center, shortened to OTKES; Swedish: Olycksutredningscentralen) is the accident investigation authority of Finland. It investigates all major accidents, and all aviation, maritime, and rail accidents and incidents. SIAF is located within the Ministry of Justice, and is headquartered in Helsinki, Finland.

The SIAF was previously known in English as the Accident Investigation Board of Finland.

== Organization ==
The SIAF consists of five investigation branches: aviation, maritime, rail, social and healthcare, and other accidents. In addition, the government can ask SIAF to investigate any other exceptional events. The SIA has appointed a chief investigator to each branch.

Investigation branch	Description	Chief investigator
Aviation	The investigation of incidents and accidents regarding aviation in Finland.	Ismo Aaltonen
Maritime	The investigation of accidents and dangerous situations that take place on Finnish territorial waters or in which a Finland-based vessel is involved.	Risto Haimila
Rail	The investigation of especially hazardous accidents that happen either in rail, metro, or tram traffic, such as level crossing accidents, rolling stock fires, and train collisions.	Esko Värttiö
Social and Healthcare	The purpose of the investigation branch is to investigate social and healthcare accidents in Finland.	Hanna Tiirinki
Other accidents	The Other accidents-branch investigates serious accidents that pose a risk to life or that cause significant economic or environmental harm.	Kai Valonen
Exceptional events	Exceptional events are not accidents but posed a severe risk to life and society. The SIAF has investigated six of such events (as of 2025): the Jokela school shooting (2007), Kauhajoki school shooting (2008), murder of 8-year-old Eerika (2012), Turku stabbing (2017), COVID-19 pandemic in Finland (2020), and City of Helsinki data breach (2024).	Kai Valonen

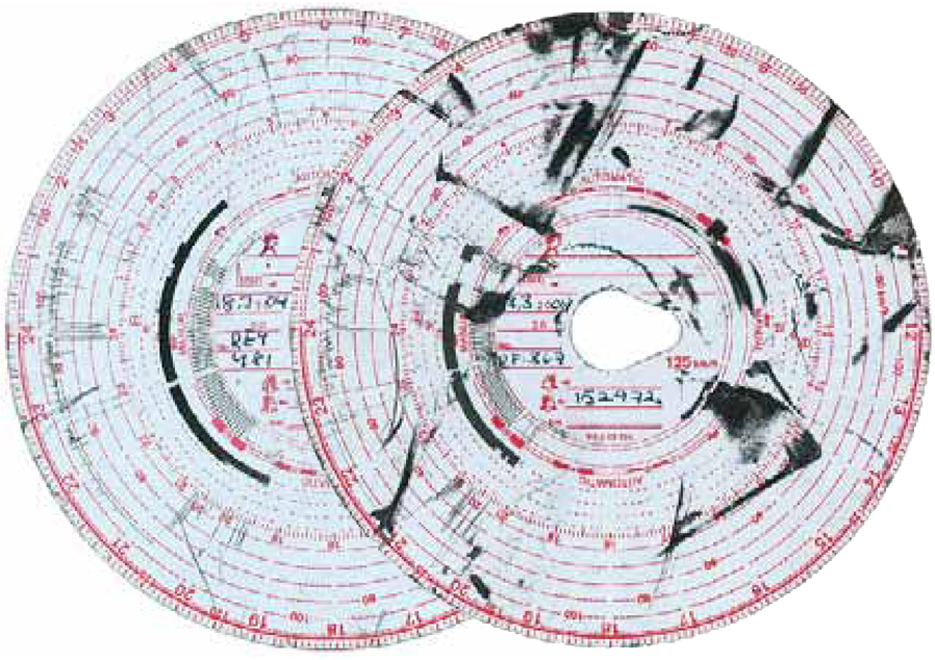
These two tachographs were retrieved by the Safety Investigation Authority from the Konginkangas bus disaster in 2004
