= Pieni-Onkamo =

Lake in Finland

- Location within Finland
- Coordinates: 62°22′N 29°55′E
- Type: Lake
- Primary inflows: Salmensillan salmi
- Primary outflows: Nivajoki
- Catchment area: Vuoksi
- Basin countries: Finland
- Surface area: 12.614 km^{2} (4.870 sq mi)
- Average depth: 2.46 m (8 ft 1 in)
- Max. depth: 7.4 m (24 ft)
- Water volume: 0.031 km^{3} (25,000 acre⋅ft)
- Shore length^{1}: 47.57 km (29.56 mi)
- Surface elevation: 77 m (253 ft)
- Frozen: December–April
- Islands: Reposaari
- ^{1} Shore length is not a well-defined measure.

Pieni-Onkamo is a medium-sized lake in the Vuoksi main catchment area in Finland. It is located in the North Karelia region. The lake is separated from another lake Suuri-Onkamo with nice esker called Sintsi.

== See also ==
- List of lakes in Finland
