= Konginkangas bus disaster =

2004 traffic accident in Äänekoski, Finland

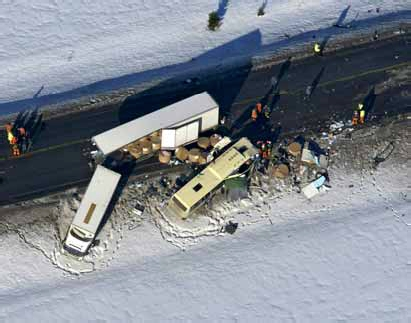
- Aerial view of the crash
- Date: 19 March 2004
- Location: Konginkangas, Äänekoski, Central Finland, Finland; 62°46.620′N 25°46.938′E
- Deaths: 23
- Injuries: 14

The Konginkangas bus disaster was a major road traffic crash on 19 March 2004, outside the village of Konginkangas in Äänekoski, Central Finland. At 02:08 local time (00:08 UTC), a bus transporting 38 passengers, most of them youths, to the Rukatunturi skiing center for an alpine ski trip crashed into a full-trailer truck carrying heavy paper rolls weighing about 61.5 tonnes (60.5 long tons; 67.8 short tons) total. The crash occurred on Finnish national road 4 (E75) 20 kilometres (12 mi) north of Äänekoski, and left the bus driver and 22 passengers dead; fourteen were injured. The executive director of the youth travel company was among those who perished in the crash. Most of the victims were killed immediately by the paper rolls ejected into the bus. The truck driver was uninjured.

== Crash ==
The crash occurred when the trailer of the southbound truck began a soft swerving movement on black ice, which intermittently covered the highway. The trailer first swerved to the right onto the edge of the road, then returned to the road and drifted left onto the lane of oncoming traffic. Despite an evasion attempt by the driver, the trailer continued to run in the opposite lane. The northbound bus then collided with the front wall of the trailer. Five 780-kilogram (1,720 lb) paper rolls were ejected through the front wall of the trailer, pushing the wall and paper rolls into the bus at a speed of 70 km/h (43 mph). The winter speed limit on the road was 80 km/h (50 mph). The front of the bus, as well as several rows of seats, were demolished on impact.

== Investigation ==
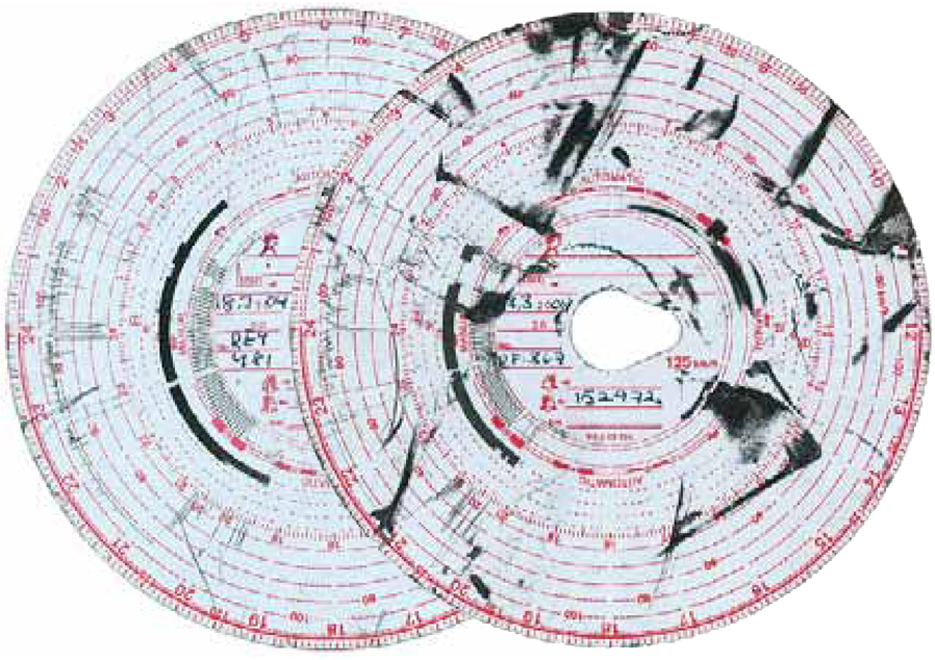
These two tachographs were retrieved by the Safety Investigation Authority at the Konginkangas crash site

The crash was investigated by Finland's Safety Investigation Authority (SIAF). In total, the SIAF found 32 causes of the crash, the most immediate being the truck driver's loss of control. The main contributing factors to the crash were the choice of an unfavorable route, the high speed of the truck and the possible reduced alertness of the driver. In the SIAF's view, none of the bus passengers wore a seat belt, while the bus driver, driving at high speed in snowy weather, made an error in observing the oncoming truck and attempted to avoid the collision too late. The SIAF found no technical defects with either vehicle. The routes of both vehicles were designed in such a way that it would not have been possible to drive them in compliance with both the speed limits in force and the drivers' driving and rest time regulations. In addition, the SIAF found that the road surface was very slippery and that an area of local slipperiness was difficult to detect or predict.

The SIAF issued seventeen safety recommendations, the most important of which could be considered to be the transfer of responsibility for transport from the driver alone to all parties involved. Other notable proposals include lowering the maximum speed limit for truck speed limiters to 80 km/h and using the speed information stored by the tachograph to punish breaches of the speed limit. The SIAF considered the crash-worthiness of the front end of the bus to be insufficient in such a crash, but did not make any recommendations to improve the situation. Instead, Volvo reinforced the front of the body of its 9700 model on its own initiative in 2004.

== Trial ==
On 31 May 2006, the Äänekoski District Court gave the truck driver a suspended sentence of three months' imprisonment for endangering traffic safety, 23 fatalities and three injuries. In addition, the transport company Transpoint was fined a community fine of EUR 10,000 for an occupational safety offense.

The trial continued on 18 December 2006 in the Vaasa Court of Appeal, as the truck driver appealed against the verdict. A few interested parties also expressed dissatisfaction with the verdict of the Äänekoski District Court, but none of them ultimately appealed.

On 23 January 2007, the Court of Appeal upheld the District Court's decision largely unchanged. The truck driver did not appeal the verdict to the Supreme Court of Finland, so the verdict of the Court of Appeal remained final.
