= Dunderland Valley bus crash =

1948 bus crash in Norway

- Native name: Dunderlandsdalsulykken
- Date: 5 July 1948
- Time: 1:15 PM, CET
- Location: Dunderland Valley in Norway; 66°26′08″N 14°48′39″E
- Type: Bus accident
- Deaths: 16
- Injuries: 5

The Dunderland Valley bus crash, also called the Dunderlandsdals bus accident was a bus crash that occurred on 5 July 1948 when a bus veered off the road and ended up in the Ranelva River in the Dunderland Valley 45 km (28 mi) north of Mo i Rana in Norway. Of the 21 people on board, 16 people died. The deceased were all Southern Sami on their way home to Helgeland and Nord-Trøndelag from the inaugural meeting of the Norske Reindriftsamers Landsforbund in Tromsø, they had planned to stop in Mo i Rana for dinner. One of the bodies was never recovered. The accident occurred after the bus's left front wheel exploded, causing the bus to crash off the road and end up in the flooded river. Once in the river, the bus flipped on its side, trapping the people inside as the vehicle was carried downstream. All of the fatalities resulted from the bus passengers being carried away and drowned in the flooded river. Four days prior to the accident, the bus had been in another accident caused by the steering wheel locking in which no one was seriously injured. A memorial stone was erected at the scene of the accident in 1950. The Dunderlandsdals accident is tied with the Måbødalen bus accident for the deadliest vehicle accident in post-WWII Norwegian history.

== See also ==
- Beaune coach crash
- Sierre coach crash
- Måbødalen bus accident
