= List of Norwegian architects =

Following is a list of Norwegian architects.

== A–M ==
- Arnstein Arneberg (1882–1961)
- George Awsumb (1880–1959)
- Lars Backer (1892–1930)
- Ove Bang (1895–1942)
- Gudolf Blakstad (1893–1985)
- Peter Andreas Blix (1831–1901)
- Kari Nissen Brodtkorb (born 1942), architect and educator, Houen Foundation Award for Stranden housing complex in Oslo
- Christian Christie (1832–1906)
- Birgit Cold (born 1936)
- John Engh (1915–1996)
- Sverre Fehn (1924–2009)
- Baltazar Nicolai Garben (1794–1867)
- Christian Heinrich Grosch (1801–1865)
- Lilla Hansen (1872–1962)
- Jan Inge Hovig (1920–1977)
- Tormod Hustad (1889–1973)
- Jacob Christie Kielland (1897–1972)
- Jens Zetlitz Monrad Kielland (1866–1926)
- Kjell Kosberg (born 1953)
- Hans Ditlev Franciscus Linstow (1787–1851)
- Kjell Lund (1927–2013)
- Sigurd Lunde (1874–1936)
- Ivar Lykke (born 1941)
- Herman Munthe-Kaas (1890–1977)
- Ingeborg Krafft (1902–1963)

== N–Z ==
- Odd Nansen (1901–1973)
- Johan Henrik Nebelong (1817–1871)
- Christian Norberg-Schulz (1926–2000)
- Olaf Nordhagen (1883–1925)
- Magnus Poulsson (1881–1958)
- Egill Reimers (1878–1946)
- Kirsten Sand (1895–1996), first woman to graduate in architecture from the Norwegian Institute of Technology
- Heinrich Ernst Schirmer (1814–1887)
- Knut Selberg (born 1949)
- Holger Sinding-Larsen (1869–1938)
- Kirsten Sinding-Larsen (1898–1978)
- Nils Slaatto (1923–2001)

== See also ==
- Architecture of Norway
- List of architects
- List of Norwegians
