= Houen Foundation Award =

Norwegian architecture award

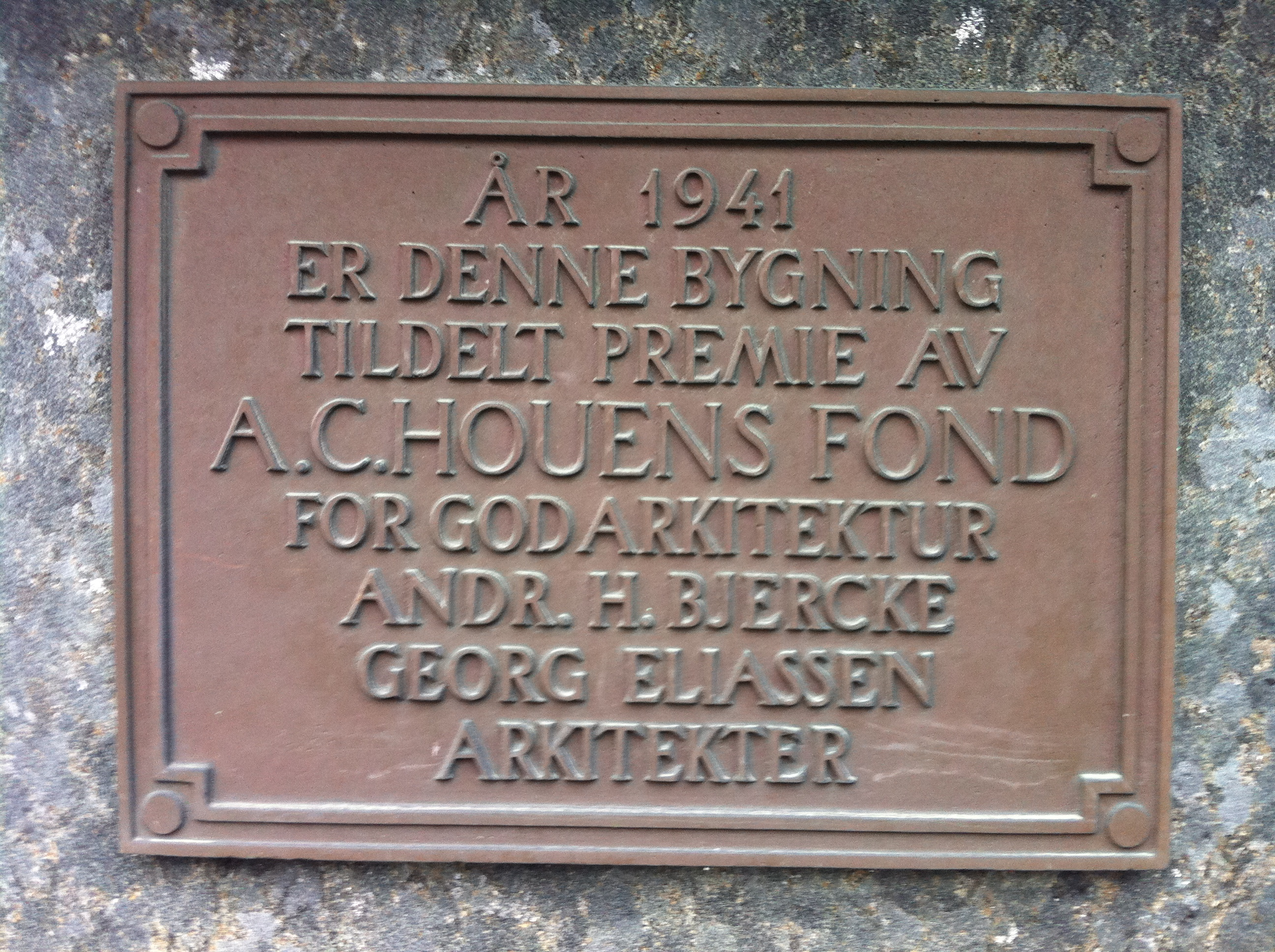
Plaque on the Norwegian Shipowners' Association building in Oslo, winner of the Houen Foundation Award in 1941

The Houen Foundation Award (Norwegian: Houens fonds diplom) is Norway's most important award for architecture. It was established in 1893 by Anton Christian Houen (1823–1894). A successful merchant and businessman, Houen established several philanthropic legacies and funds in culture and research.

The Houen Foundation Award is awarded to buildings that are examples of "outstanding, independently completed works of architecture" in recognition of an architect's highest achievement. The award is made by the Norwegian Ministry of Culture at a recommendation from the board of the Association of Norwegian Architects (Norske arkitekters landsforbund) in collaboration with the National Museum of Art, Architecture and Design.

== Award winners ==
Year	Image	Award winner	City	Building/Object	Comment
1904	Det norske finansdepartementet	Henrik Bull	Oslo	Akersgata 40; Regjeringskvartalet	Currently: Ministry of Finance
1912	Den Nationale Scene	Einar Oscar Schou	Bergen	Den Nationale Scene	
1923	Sjømannsskolen	Andreas Bjercke and Georg Eliassen	Oslo	Sjømannsskolen; Karlsborgveien 4	Fra 2013 Kongshavn Upper Secondary School
1923	Pipervikskirka	Harald Aars	Oslo	Pipervikskirka, Munkedamsveien 12	Demolished 1959
1923	Markveien 57	Christian Morgenstierne and Arne Eide	Oslo	Losjihus for men Markveien 57	Currently: Used by city Government
1924	Statsarkivet i Bergen	Egill Reimers	Bergen	Regional State Archives in Bergen; Årstadveien 22	
1925	Tønsberg Sjømannsskole	Andreas Bjercke and Georg Eliassen	Tønsberg	Sjømannsskolen	Currently Haugar Vestfold Art Museum
1925	Bispehaugen skole	Carl J. Moe	Trondheim	Bispehaugen school Nonnegata 19	
1925	Karl Johans gate 1, Det Forenede Dampskibs-Selskab	Magnus Poulsson	Oslo	Det Forenede Dampskibs-Selskab; Karl Johans gate 1	
1925	Villa Westfal-Larsen	Ole Landmark	Bergen	Villa Westfal-Larsen; Kalfarveien 48	
1926	Nasjonalgalleriet	Adolf Schirmer	Oslo	National gallery Universitetsgata 13	
1926	Vigeland-museet	Lorentz Ree and Carl Buch	Oslo	Gustav Vigeland museum Nobels gate 32	
1927	Villa Mustad (Elsero)	Arnstein Arneberg	Oslo	Villa Mustad (Elsero); Arnstein Arnebergs vei 3	
1927	Trondhjems Sparebank	Jakob Holmgren	Trondheim	Trondhjems Sparebank, new interior Kongens gate 4	
1928	Den norske Creditbank	Kristian Biong	Oslo	Den norske Creditbank; Kirkegata 21	
1929	Grand Hotel Terminus	Fredrik Arnesen and Arthur Darre Kaarbø	Bergen	Grand Hotel Terminus; Kong Oscars gate 71	
1929	Telegrafbygningen i Bergen	Anton Kielland and Finn Berner	Bergen	Telegrafbygningen (Bergen); Starvhusgaten 4	
1930		Frederik Konow Lund	Bergen	Villa Blaauw; Årstadveien 19	
1930	Det Nye Teater	Gudolf Blakstad and Jens Dunker	Oslo	Det Nye Teater; Rosenkrantz' gate 10	Nå Oslo nye teater
1930	Bærum rådhus	Magnus Poulsson	Sandvika	Bærum rådhus	
1930	Akersgata 21	Carl Michalsen and Eystein Michalsen	Oslo	Astoria hotell Akersgata 21	Nå kontorbygg for Stortinget
1931	Kunstnernes hus	Gudolf Blakstad and Herman Munthe-Kaas	Oslo	Kunstnernes hus Wergelandsveien 17	
1931	Studentersamfundet i Trondhjem	Carl Michalsen and Eystein Michalsen	Trondheim	Studentersamfundet i Trondhjem; Elgeseter gate 1	
1931	Trondheim Kunstmuseum	Peter Daniel Hofflund	Trondheim	Trondhjems kunstforening Bispegata 7b	Nå Trondheim Kunstmuseum
1932	Storetveit kirke	Ole Landmark	Fana	Storetveit kirke Kirkeveien 9	
1933	Oslo Lysverker	Andreas Bjercke and Georg Eliassen	Oslo	Oslo Lysverker; Sommerrogata 1	Nå Hafslund ASA
1933	Prinsens gate 2, De-No-Fa-gården	O. Eindride Slaatto	Oslo	De-No-Fa-gården; Prinsens gate 2	
1934	Haugesund rådhus	Gudolf Blakstad and Herman Munthe-Kaas	Haugesund	Haugesund rådhus	
1934		Otto Valentin Juell and Otto Legaard Scheen	Oslo	Vinmonopolets anlegg Haslevangen 16	
1936		Arne Vesterlid	Trondheim	Handelsstandens hus Dronningens gate 12	
1936		Ove Bang	Oslo	Det Norske Lutherske Indremisjonsselskap; Staffeldts gate 4	
1937	Villa Damman i Havna allé	Sverre Aasland and Arne Korsmo	Oslo	Havna villakvarter Havna allé	
1937	Svein Rosselands hus på Blindern	Finn Bryn and Johan Ellefsen	Oslo	Universitetsanlegget på Blindern, første del	
1938	Aftenpostens nybygg fra 1938	Finn Bryn and Johan Ellefsen	Oslo	Aftenpostens nybygg Apotekergata 6	Nå under oppussing av Entra ASA
1939	Kornsilo for Christiansands Møller as	Sverre Aasland and Arne Korsmo	Kristiansand	Silo for Christianssands Møller	
1939		Erlend Tryti	Bergen	A/S Jacob Kjødes forretningsbygg Jacob Kjødes veg 15	
1941	Redernes hus	Andreas Bjercke and Georg Eliassen	Oslo	Redernes hus Rådhusgata 25	
1948	Telegrafbygninga i Trondheim	Peter Daniel Hofflund	Trondheim	Telegrafbygninga; Kongens gate 8	
1949	Blauwgården i Bergen. (by Frode Inge Helland)	Leif Grung	Bergen	Blaauwgården; C. Sundts gate 1	
1961		Arne Pedersen and Reidar Lund	Sarpsborg	A/S Borregaards nyanlegg	
1961		Byarkitekten i Oslo v/ Sverre Fehn and Geir Grung	Oslo	Økernhjemmet; Økernveien 151	
1961	Ingierstrand bad	Eyvind Moestue and Ole Lind Schistad	Oppegård	Ingierstrand bad and restaurant	
1961	Strimmelen (by Aqwis)	Halfdan B. Grieg	Bergen	Boliganlegget Strimmelen; Landåslien/Natlandsveien	
1961	Royal Christiania (by Bjoertvedt 2008)	Knut Knutsen and Fredrik Winsnes	Oslo	Hotel Viking; Biskop Gunnerus' street 3	Currently Hotel Royal Christiania
1961	Stortingsbygningas lobby	Nils Holter	Oslo		
1961	Arkitekt Per Griegs Sundt stormagasin fra 1938 i Bergen. (by Frode Inge Helland)	Per Grieg	Bergen	Sundt & Co; Torgalmenningen 14	
1966	Domkirkeplassen 1	Gert Walter Thuesen and Herman Tufte	Stavanger	Stavanger Sparekasse; Domkirkeplassen 1	Nå SpareBank 1 SR-Bank
1975	Fylkessjukehuset	Anna and Jostein Molden	Stord	Fylkessjukehuset	
1975	Norsk sjøfartsmuseum	Trond Eliassen and Birger Lambertz-Nilssen	Oslo	Norsk sjøfartsmuseum Bygdøynesveien 37	
1975	Domkirkeplassen 3	Louis Kloster	Stavanger	Norges Bank; Domkirkeplassen 3	Nå Stavanger Turistinformasjon
1975	St. Hallvard kirke and kloster	Lund & Slaatto	Oslo	St. Hallvard kirke and kloster Enerhauggata 4	
1975	Storhamarlåven	Sverre Fehn	Hamar	Hamar museum ruins of bispegårdsruiner and Storhamarlåven	
1975	Beitostølen helsesportsenter	Telje-Torp-Aasen	Øystre Slidre	Beitostølen helsesportsenter	
1975	Bete/beitski-hytte	Turid Haaland	-	Hyttesystemet «Bete/Beitski»	
1975	Grorud brannstasjon	Østbye, Kleven & Almaas	Oslo	Grorud brannstasjon Nedre Rommen 2	
1983	Kristiansand folkebibliotek	4B Arkitekter	Kristiansand	Kristiansand folkebibliotek Rådhusgata 11	
1983	Munkegata	Arne E. Holm	Trondheim	Exterior color scheme of Munkegata	
1983		Bjart Mohr	Hurum	Holmsbu billedgalleri	
1983	Bryggen i Bergen	Hans Jacob Hansteen	Bergen	Restoration of Bryggen	
1983	Dragvoll	Henning Larsens Tegnestue	Trondheim	University at Dragvoll	
1983		Jan Digerud and Jon Lundberg	Oslo	Interior of Universitetsforlaget; Kolstadgata 1	
1983	Politihuset i Grønlandsleiret. (by C. Hill, 2007)	Telje-Torp-Aasen	Oslo	Police HQ (Politihuset); Grønlandsleiret 44	
1983		Terje Moe	Oslo	Architect's own home in Bygdøy; Mellbyedalen 9b	
1988	Royal Garden Hotel	CFKL Arkitects	Trondheim	Royal Garden Hotel; Kjøpmannsgata 73	
1988		Arkitektgruppen CUBUS	Bergen	Loddefjord school Elvetun 27	
1988	Sjøgata i Mosjøen	Dag Nilsen	Mosjøen	Conservation of Sjøgata	
1988	Gamle Stavanger	Foreningen Gamle Stavanger and Stavanger kommune v/ Einar Hedén	Stavanger	Conservation of Stavanger Old Town	
1988	Det Norske Veritas	Lund & Slaatto	Bærum (Høvik)	Det Norske Veritas (DNV)	
1988	Indre Østfold meieri	Meierienes Bygningskontor v/ Dag Borgen in cooperation with GASA	Eidsberg	Indre Østfold dairy	Demolished in 2016
1988		Niels Torp	Oslo	Giskehagen boligområde Holmenveien 38	
1988	Holmlia holdeplass	NSB Arkitektkontor ved Arne Henriksen	Oslo	Holmlia station	
1988	Jugendbyen Ålesund	Ålesund kommune ved Olav Høydal	Ålesund	Conservation of the Art Nouveau Buildings (Jugendbyen)	
1991	Sola videregående skole	Hoem-Kloster-Jacobsen	Sola	Sola Upper Secondary School; Åsnutveien 51	
1991	St. Magnus katolske kirke	Lund & Slaatto	Lillestrøm	St. Magnus Catholic church Romeriksgata 1	
1991	Vognhall Lodalen	NSB Arkitektkontor ved Arne Henriksen	Oslo	Carrige shed Lodalen; Dyvekes vei (Oslo) 2	
1991	Trondhjems Kunstforening	Ola Steen Arkitektkontor and Svein Wolle	Trondheim	Trondhjems Kunstforening, atriumbygget Bispegata 7b	Currently Trondheim Art Museum
1991	Villa Schreiner	Sverre Fehn	Oslo	Villa Schreiner; Langmyrgrenda 79	
1994	Stranden, Aker Brygge	Arkitektkontoret Kari Nissen Brodtkorb	Oslo	Stranden; Aker Brygge	
1994		Lund & Slaatto	Stavanger	Sølvberget, Stavanger kulturhus	
1994		Per Knudsen Arkitektkontor	Trondheim	Medisinsk teknisk senter Olav Kyrres gate 3	
1994	Norsk Bremuseum	Sverre Fehn	Fjærland	Norwegian Glacier Museum	
2000	Ibsenkvartalet (by Hans-Petter Fjeld)	Gunnarsjaa + Kolstad Arkitekter	Oslo	Ibsenkvartalet; C.J. Hambros plass 2	
2000		Haga & Grov, Knut Hjeltnes and Ivar Egge	Dale, Sogn	Nordisk kunstnarsenter Dalsåsen	
2000	Justervesenet	Kristin Jarmund Arkitekter	Kjeller	Norwegian Metrology Service; Fetveien 99	
2000	VG-huset i Akersgata	Lund & Slaatto	Oslo	VG building Akersgata 55	
2000		Lund Hagem Arkitekter	Oslo	Villa Furulund; Furulundsveien 10 a and b	
2000	Tønsberg and Nøtterøy bibliotek	Lunde & Løvseth	Tønsberg	Tønsberg library Storgaten 16	
2003		Blå strek	Tromsø	Grønnegata 21–23	
2003	Asker krematoriums bårehus	Carl-Viggo Hølmebakk	Asker	Bårehus near Asker krematorium	
2003	Arkitektur- and designhøgskolen i Oslo	Jarmund/Vigsnæs	Oslo	Arkitekthøgskolen; Maridalsveien 29	
2008	Terminalbygget, Oslo lufthavn, Gardermoen	Aviaplan	Gardermoen	Terminal; Oslo airport, Gardermoen	
2008	Norges Varemesse	Arne Henriksen and Bystrup arkitekter	Lillestrøm	Nova Spektrum	
2008	Ivar Aasen-tunet	Sverre Fehn	Ørsta	Aasentunet	
2008		Snøhetta	Alexandria	Bibliotheca Alexandrina	
2008	Mortensrud kirke	Jensen & Skodvin Arkitektkontor	Oslo	Mortensrud Church	
2012		Jensen & Skodvin Arkitektkontor	Valldal	Juvet Landscape Hotel	
2012		Bård Helland	Trondheim	«Veiskillet» – houses for homeless people	
2012		Space Group	Nesøya	«V-House» – Villa Varner Grønsundåsen 23	
2012		Steven Holl Architects and LY arkitekter	Hamarøy	Hamsunsenteret	
2012		Snøhetta	Oslo	Oslo Opera	
2015	Fasaden til Utdanningsforbundets konferansesenter, også kjent som Lærernes hus.	Element arkitekter	Oslo	Lærernes hus	
2015		Longva arkitekter	Bergen	Militært treningsanlegg, Haakonsvern	
2015	Fotgjengertunnelen som leder til den vestre utgangen av Nationaltheatret stasjon.	Arne Eggen Arkitekter	Oslo	Nationaltheatret stasjon – adkomst vest	
2015		Jan Inge Hovig	Tromsø	Ishavskatedralen	
2015		Knud Munk	Bergen	Grieghallen	
2015		Reiulf Ramstad Arkitekter	Rauma	Vandring and utsiktspunkt, Trollstigen	
2019		Knut Hjeltnes sivilarkitekter MNAL	Stavanger	Våningshus Dalaker/Galta	
2019		DRDH Architects	Bodø	Stormen Kulturkvartal	
2019	Boligprosjektet D36 The Green House i Dælenenggata	Element arkitekter	Oslo	D36 The Green House	
2019	Holmenkollbakken sett ovenifra	JDS architects	Oslo	Holmenkollbakken	
2020		ingen utdeling			
2021		ingen utdeling			
2022		ingen utdeling			
2023		Snøhetta	Montignac, France	Lascaux IV International Centre for Cave Art	
2023		Vandkunsten	Bjørvika, Oslo	Vannkunsten	
2023		Arnstein Arneberg and Magnus Poulsson	Oslo	Oslo City Hall (Oslo rådhus)	

== See also ==
- A. C. Houen Grant
