= Jens Gram Dunker =

Norwegian architect (1892–1981)

- Born: February 17, 1892; Christiania, Norway
- Died: August 25, 1981 (aged 89)
- Occupation: Architect

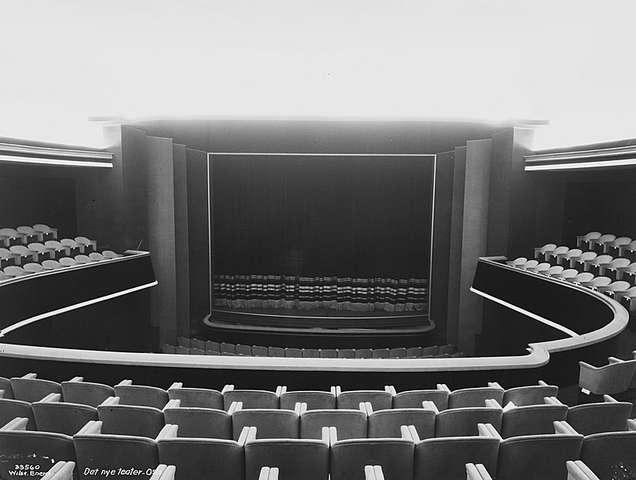
Det Nye Teater in Oslo. 1929

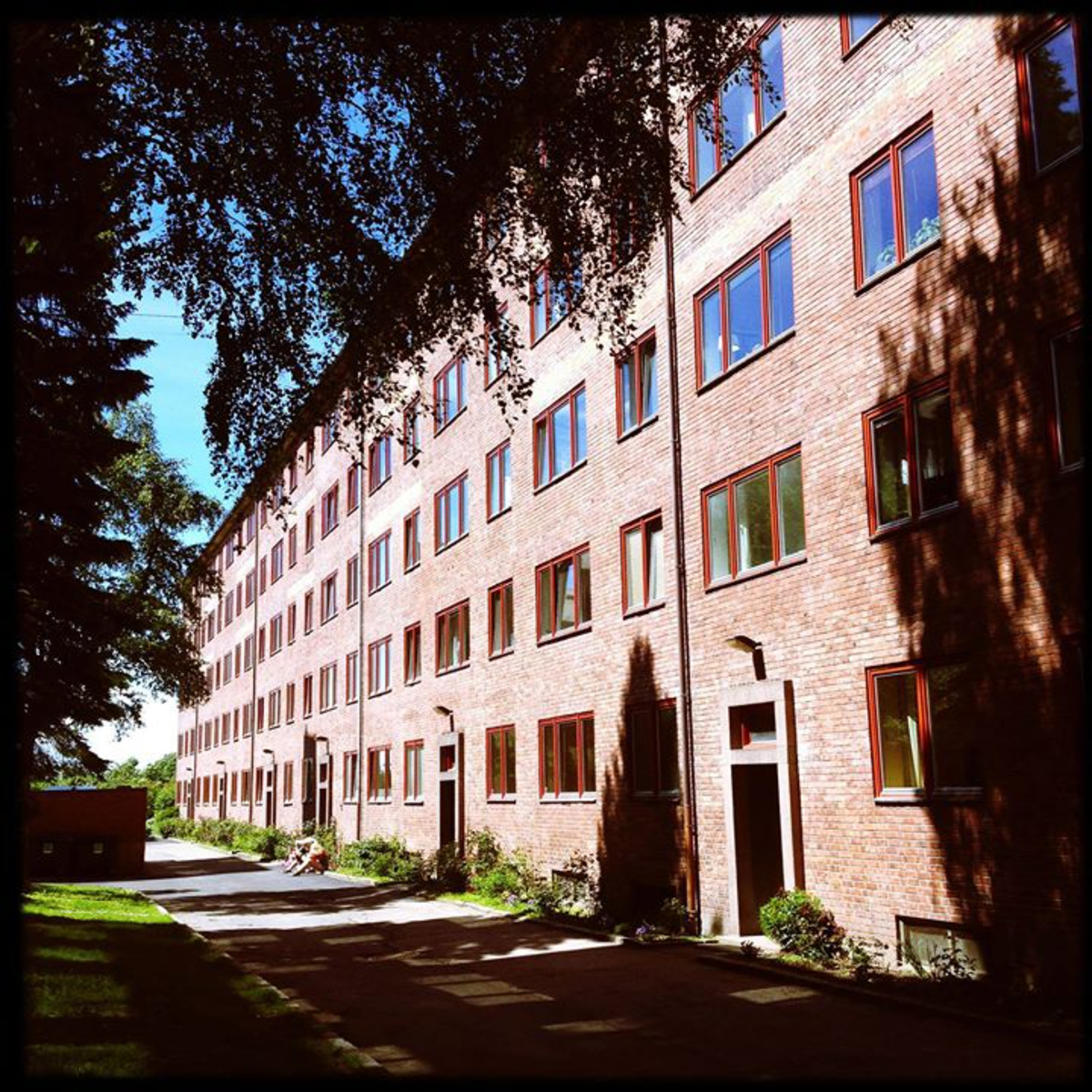
Myrahagen borettslag in Oslo. 1938

Jens Gram Dunker (February 17, 1892 – August 25, 1981) was a Norwegian architect. He was noted for his work in the transition between neo-classicism and functionalism in Norwegian architecture. Dunker made significant contributions to Norwegian functionalism through different types of buildings: townhouses, housing blocks, townhouses, villas, theaters and hotels.

== Biography ==
Dunker was born in Christiania (now Oslo), Norway. He attended the Norwegian National Academy of Craft and Art Industry (1910-11) and took architectural education (1911–14) at Technische Hochschule in Dresden.

He first worked at several architectural offices in Christiania including with Morgenstierne & Eide, with Arnstein Arneberg and with Harald Hals (1876–1959). In 1919 he established his own architectural practice. Together with Gudolf Blakstad, he drew the theatre building for Det Nye Teater which opened in Oslo during 1929. This building marked an important transition between neo-classicism and functionalism in Norwegian architecture. The design of the Det Nye Teater by Blakstad and Dunker was awarded the Houen Foundation Award in 1930.

Dunker also performed restoration work at Oscarshall and at several churches including Fåvang Stave Church (1948–51) in Ringebu Municipality and Slidredomen in Vestre Slidre Municipality (1955–56). In 1938, he was hired as a manager at the Royal Palace, Oslo, retiring in 1962 after a lengthy building restoration that commenced in 1950. He received a number of honors, including the Order of St. Olav (1945) and the King's Medal of Merit as well as several foreign orders.
