= Hotel Viking =

Hotel Viking may refer to:

- Clarion Hotel The Hub (Oslo), former names: Hotel Viking and Hotel Royal Christiania in Oslo, Norway
- Hotel Viking (Newport, Rhode Island), United States, a historic hotel
