= Vesterlid =

Vesterlid is a surname. Notable people with the surname include:

- Are Vesterlid (1921–2013), Norwegian architect
- Arne Vesterlid (1893–1962), Norwegian architect
