= Oslo Nye Teater =

Theater in Norway

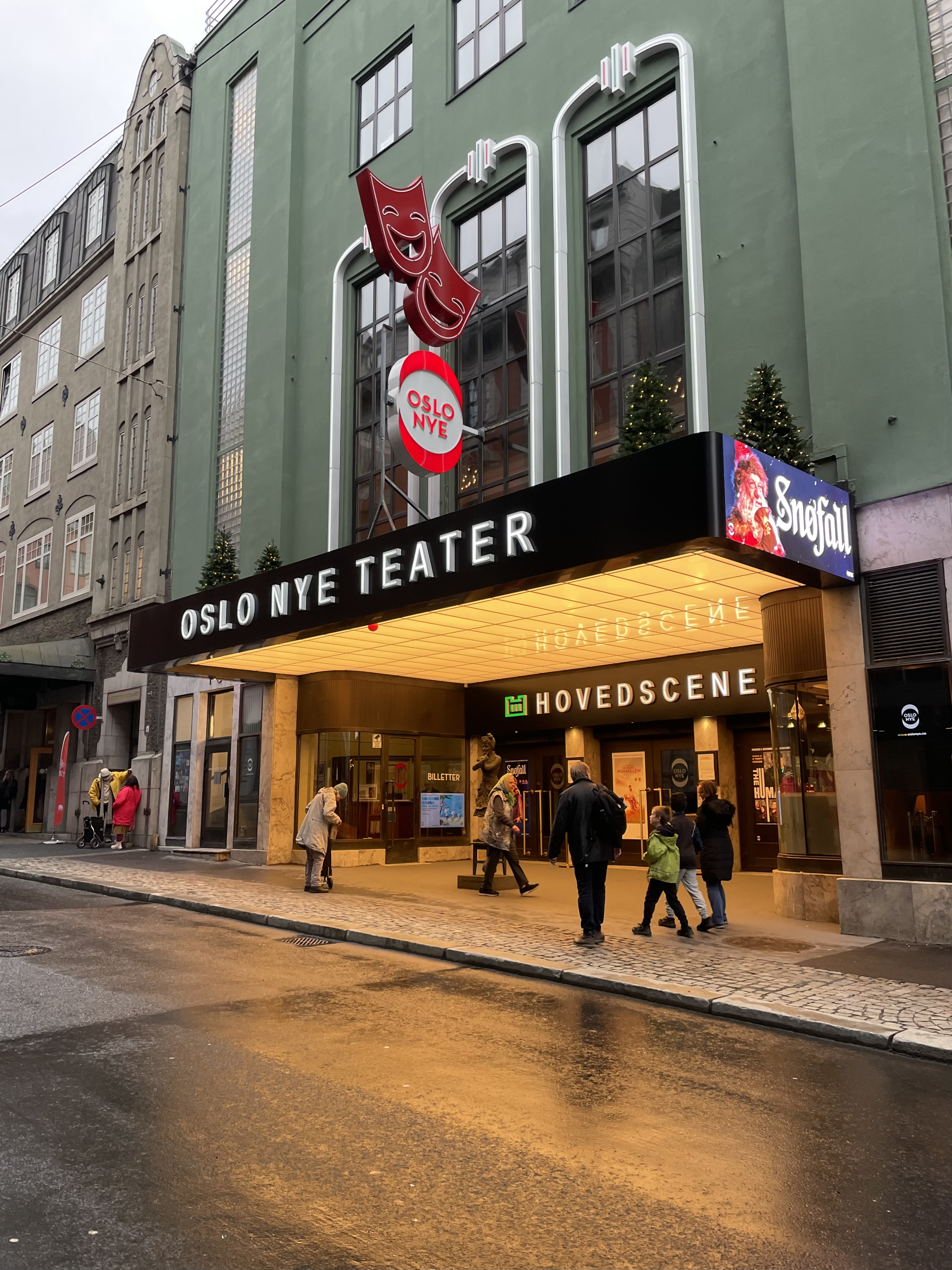
- Interactive map of Oslo Nye Teater
- Former names: Det Nye Teater
- Address: Rosenkrantz' gate 10; Oslo; Norway
- Coordinates: 59.9143°N 10.7397°E
- Owner: Oslo Municipality
- Type: Theatre

Construction
- Opened: 26 February 1929
- Renovated: 1994–1995
- Years active: 1929–present
- Architects: Gudolf Blakstad, Jens Gram Dunker

Website
- oslonye.no

Oslo Nye Teater is a theater in Oslo, Norway. Its main venue is located at Rosenkrantz' gate 10, and the company is wholly owned by Oslo Municipality.

== History ==
The establishment opened as Det Nye Teater on 26 February 1929. Architects Gudolf Blakstad (1893–1985) and Jens Gram Dunker (1898–1984) were engaged to design the building, creating a neoclassical structure. From 1994 to 1995, the audience area was upgraded under the direction of the architects Kristin Jarmund and Ola Helle.

In September 1959, Oslo Nye Teater resulted from a merger between Det Nye Teater and Folketeatret, which had operated independently since 1952.

Oslo Nye Teater operates from four stages: Oslo Nye Hovedscenen, Oslo Nye Centralteatret, Oslo Nye Trikkestallen, and Oslo Nye Teaterkjeller’n.
