= Knut Hjeltnes =

Knut Hjeltnes may refer to:

- Knut Hjeltnes (discus thrower) (born 1951), Norwegian athlete
- Knut Hjeltnes (architect) (born 1961), Norwegian architect
