= Agnes fabrikker =

Former Norwegian match factory

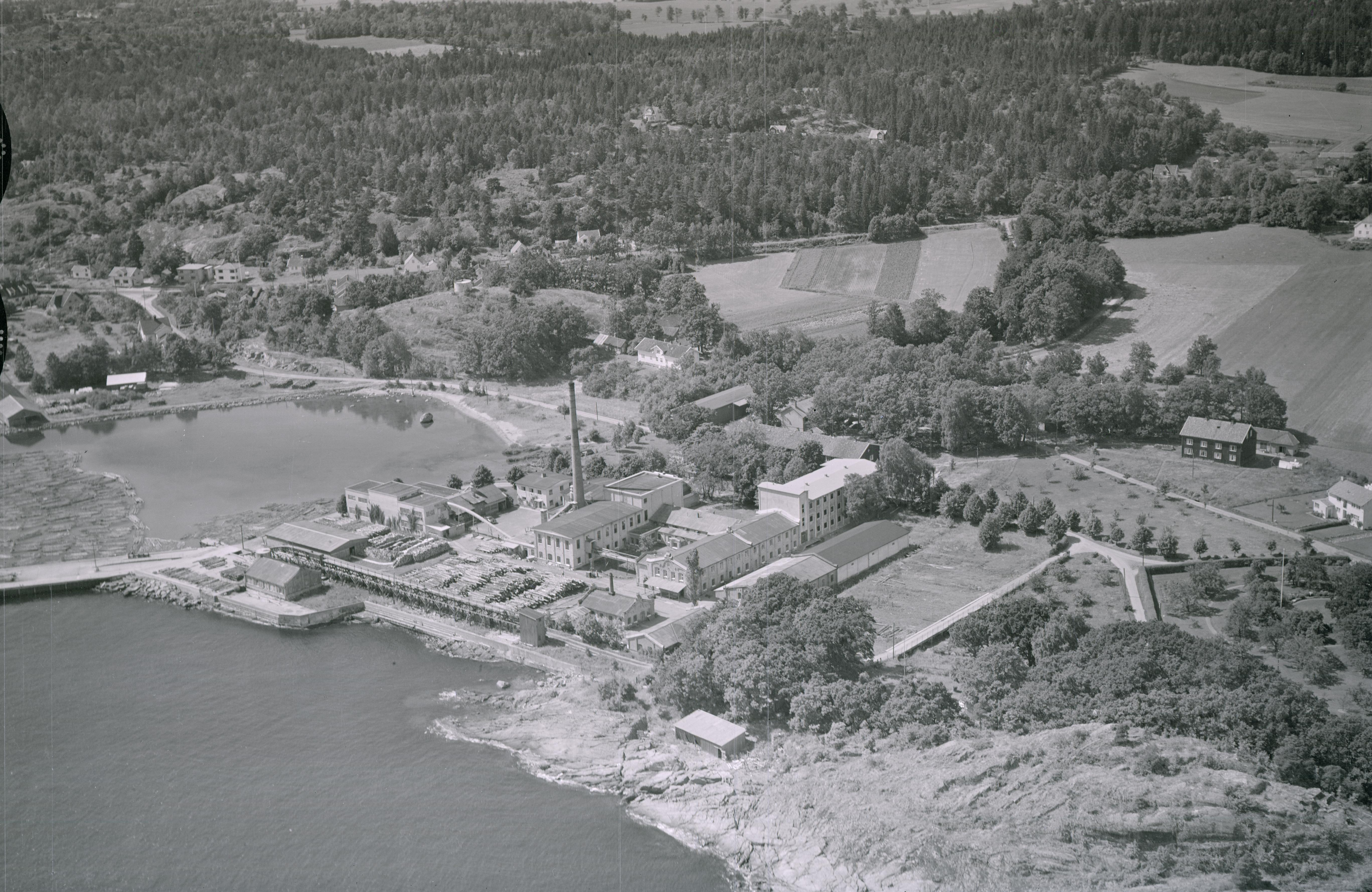
- Formerly: Agnæs Tændstikfabrik
- Type: Aksjeselskap
- Industry: Match manufacturing, particle board
- Founded: 1877
- Defunct: 1984 (matches); 2002 (particle board)
- Fate: Closed
- Headquarters: Agnes, Stavern, Vestfold, Norway
- Products: Matches, particle board
- Owner: Swedish Match; Norske Skog

Agnes fabrikker was a Norwegian match factory at Agnes near Stavern, in operation from 1877 to 1984. It was Norway's last match factory when it closed. The remaining particle board factory was closed in 2002.

== History ==
From 1862, spirits were produced in a factory building on the Agnes farm in Brunlanes Municipality, owned by the consul Christian Christiansen Jr. (1825–1894) of Larvik. Together with the engineer Jens Undahl, who had experience from several Norwegian and Swedish match factories, Christiansen converted the distillery into a match factory that started in 1877 under the name Agnæs Tændstikfabrik. It was quickly expanded and by 1879 had over 140 employees, among them 66 women and 24 boys and girls under the age of 15. Many of the workers moved to the site, which also built workers' housing, and in addition some 1,000 local people across the region are said to have been engaged in box-gluing as home work.

In 1887, after a period of wage cuts and unrest, Nittedals Tændstikfabrikk bought the factory at Agnes. The plant was modernized and expanded, and in the 1890s it became a large exporter of matches, with an annual production of over 30 million matches.

In 1927 everything was gathered under the new match giant Bryn-Halden & Nittedals Tændstikfabrik, which was in turn owned by Svenska Tändstick. All production in Norway was concentrated in two factories, at Grønvold in Oslo and at Agnes. The Oslo factory closed in 1967, while the Agnes match factory closed in 1984, and production of the Nittedal brands such as Hjelpestikker was moved to the factories of the owner, Swedish Match, in Sweden.

== Particle board factory ==
In the 1930s the factory at Agnes was expanded with a woodware factory to use the surplus material from match production. In the 1960s large-scale production of particle board began, and a new product, foil-covered ceiling panels of particle board, was launched in 1971 under the name Tak-ess, becoming one of Norway's best-selling interior products.

== Closure ==
After Bryn-Halden & Nittedal Holding, on behalf of its Swedish owners, closed the match factory in 1984, the rest of Agnes Fabrikker's business was sold in several stages to Kosmos and Norske Skog and the latter's subsidiary Forestia, among others. Through structural rationalization across its various factories, Forestia saw greater value in the seaside site at Stavern as a housing project than as an industrial area. Production of particle board and ceiling panels was closed in 2002, and the area was sold to local property developers.

== Reuse of the factory site ==
The architectural firm of Kari Nissen Brodtkorb handled the conversion of the Agnes industrial area into Sjøparken Agnes in 2007–2008, which was to include housing built on artificial islands, making a kind of Venice among the apartment blocks. The factory buildings were partly preserved and supplemented with new commercial buildings.

The central "pipe house," the building connected to the steam-boiler house with the tall factory chimney, has been preserved and restored, including a return to brick facades. In 2024 a private museum devoted to the artist Odd Nerdrum opened there, making a number of central works from the artist's own collection accessible. The museum is run by a non-profit association led by the Nerdrum family.

== Bibliography ==
- Wetting, Olav (1968). «Agnes Tændstikfabrikk», in Norsk fyrstikkindustri før år 1900. Oslo: Universitetsforlaget.
