= Volda =

Volda may refer to:

== Places ==
- Volda Municipality, a municipality in Møre og Romsdal county, Norway
- Volda (village), an urban village within Volda Municipality in Møre og Romsdal county, Norway
- Volda Church, a church in Volda Municipality in Møre og Romsdal county, Norway

== Other ==
- Volda University College, a college located in Volda Municipality in Møre og Romsdal county, Norway
- Volda TI, a sports club based in Volda Municipality in Møre og Romsdal county, Norway
- Volda Handball, a handball club based in Volda Municipality in Møre og Romsdal county, Norway
