= Ove Bang =

Norwegian architect

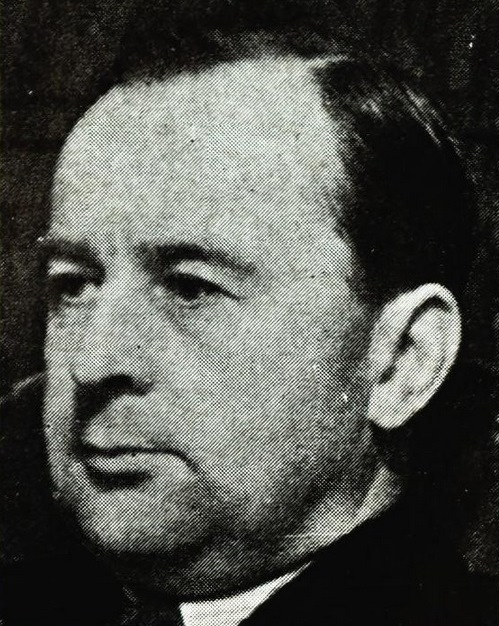
Ove Bang

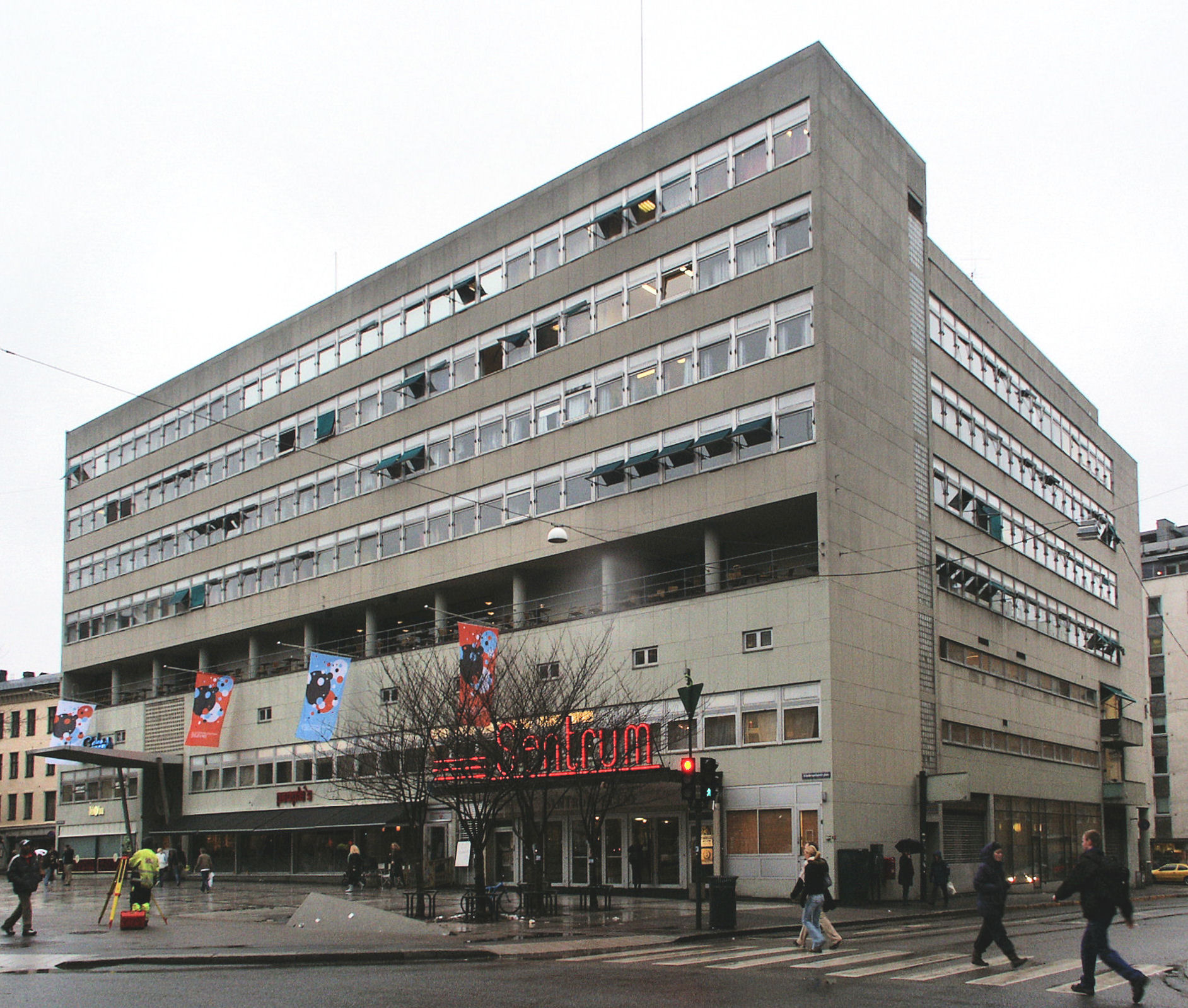
Samfunnshuset, Arbeidersamfunnets plass, Oslo

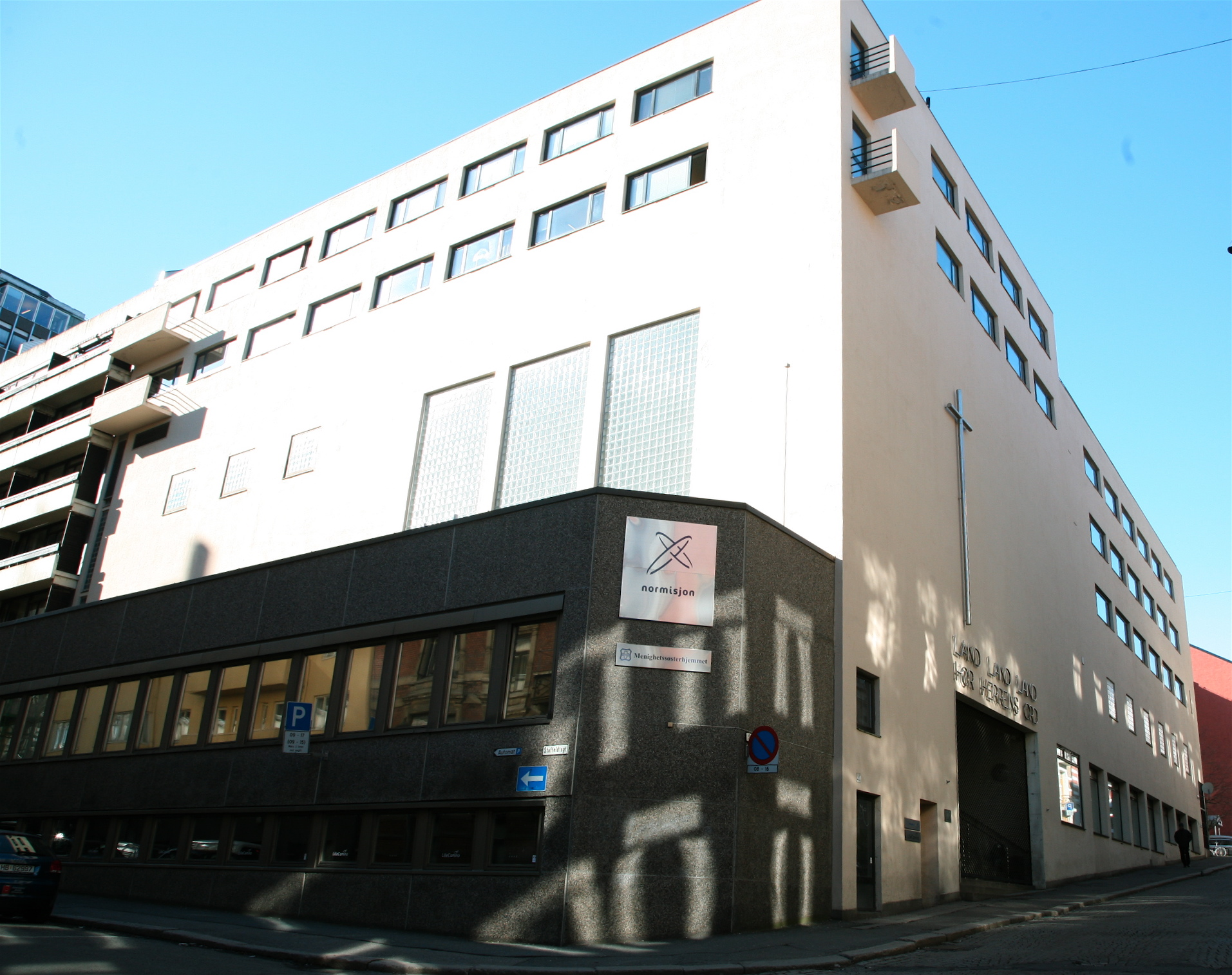
Det Norske Lutherske Indremisjonsselska in Oslo

Ove Bang (13 September 1895 – 21 May 1942) was a Norwegian architect. He was an advocate of functionalism in architecture.

== Biography ==
Ove Bang was born at Røyken in Buskerud County, Norway. He was the son of Rudolph Wilhelm Bang (1865–1935) and Maggie Caspersen (1869–1901). His father was a parish priest. The family subsequently re-located to Fredrikstad in Østfold county during 1907. Bang completed a formal study of architecture at the Norwegian Institute of Technology in Trondheim during 1917. In the years leading up to World War II, he also traveled extensively to learn architecture in England, Sweden, Italy, the Netherlands, Germany, and Czechoslovakia.

He started his professional career working in the offices of Magnus Poulsson. From 1922 to 1930, he conducted his own architectural practice at Rjukan. He also acted as a staff architect for Norsk Hydro in Rjukan, returning to his own practice in Oslo in 1930. He later delivered a series of competition proposals together with architect Øyvin Holst Grimsgaard (1900–1989). In the years 1935–36 he collaborated with the Czech architect Jan Reiner, who was a former assistant to the Swiss-French modernist architect, Le Corbusier.

Bang's work included a number of residential buildings and institutional houses. In 1936, he was awarded the Houen Foundation Award (Houens Fonds Diplom) for his work for the Norwegian Lutheran Inner Mission Society (Det Norske Lutherske Indremisjonsselskap) in Oslo. Many consider Samfunnshuset (Community Building for the Labor Movement) in Oslo to be his major work.

Ove Bang was active in both the National Association of Norwegian Architects and Oslo Architects Association. In 1942 he died after a short hospital stay. He is buried at Vestre Gravlund in Oslo.

== Other sources ==
- Findal, Wenche (1998) Mellom tradisjon og modernitet: arkitekt Ove Bang og den funksjonelle syntese (Scandinavian University Press UK) ISBN 978-8200129769
- Brekke, Nils Georg, Per Jonas Nordhagen, Siri Skjold Lexau (2003) Norsk Arkitekturhistorie : frå steinalder og bronsealder til det 21. hundreåret (Oslo : Det Norske Samlaget) ISBN 82-521-5748-3
