= Volda Church =

Church in Møre og Romsdal, Norway

- Volda kyrkje
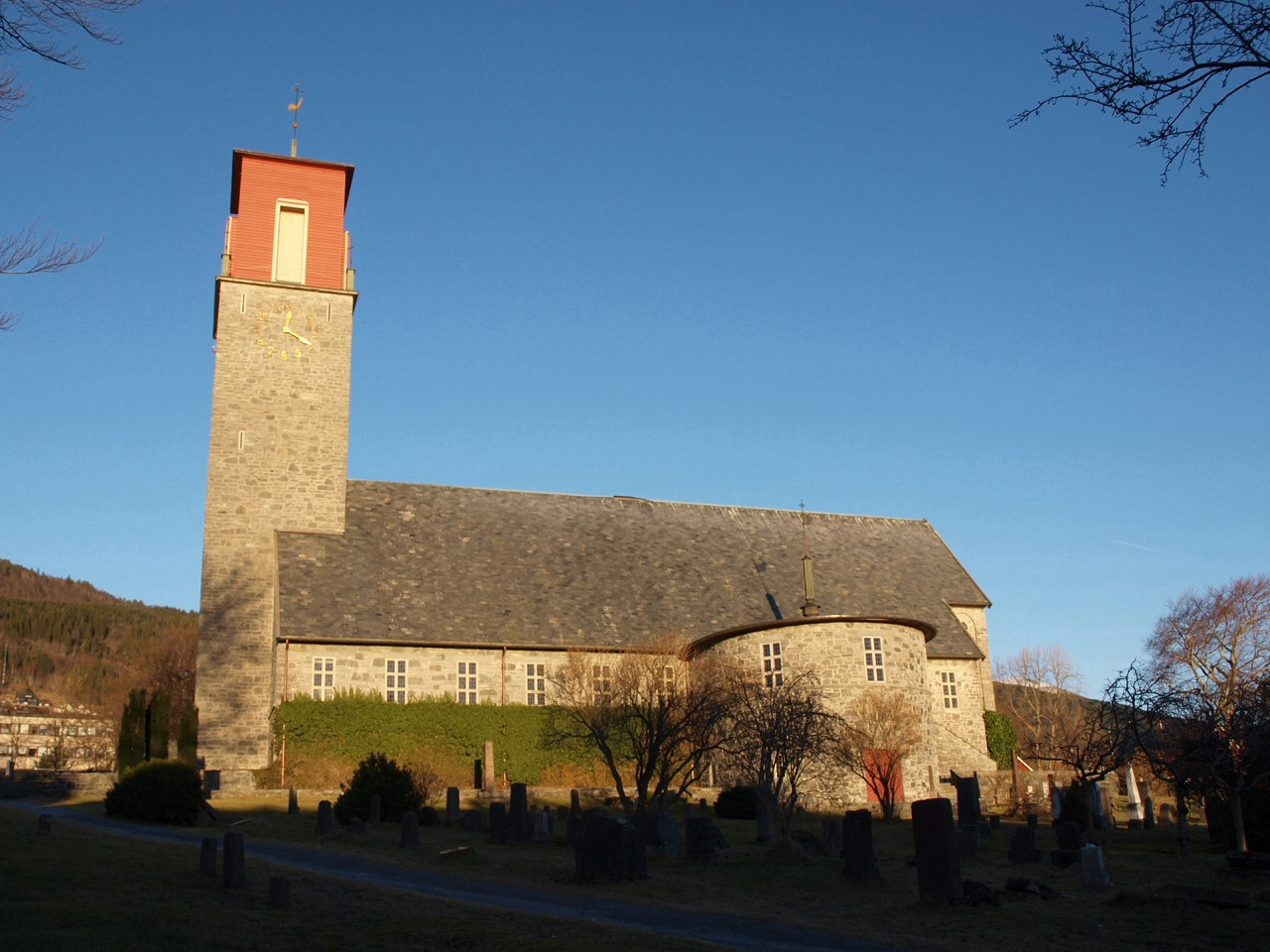
- View of the church
- Volda Church
- 62.145655278°N 6.067371368°E
- Location: Volda, Møre og Romsdal
- Country: Norway
- Denomination: Church of Norway
- Churchmanship: Evangelical Lutheran

History
- Status: Parish church
- Founded: 13th century
- Consecrated: 1 May 1932
- Events: Fire (1929)

Architecture
- Functional status: Active
- Architect: Arnstein Arneberg
- Architectural type: Long church
- Completed: 1932 (94 years ago)

Specifications
- Capacity: 800
- Materials: Stone

Administration
- Diocese: Møre bispedømme
- Deanery: Søre Sunnmøre prosti
- Parish: Volda
- Norwegian Cultural Heritage Site
- Type: Church
- Status: Automatically protected
- ID: 85865

Volda Church (Norwegian: Volda kyrkje; Voldskyrkja) is a parish church of the Church of Norway in Volda Municipality in Møre og Romsdal county, Norway. It is located in the village of Volda, along the northeastern shore of the Voldsfjorden. It is the church for the Volda parish as well as the seat of the Søre Sunnmøre prosti (deanery) in the Diocese of Møre. The large stone church was built in a long church design in 1932 using plans drawn up by the architect Arnstein Arneberg. The church seats about 800 people.

== History ==
The earliest existing historical records of the church date back to 1338, but the church existed before that time. The first church in Volda was likely built in the 1200s. The oldest known building on the site was a wooden stave church and it was located about 50 metres (160 ft) southwest of the present church site. The original nave measured about 22 by 10 metres (72 ft × 33 ft) and the choir measured about 5 by 7 metres (16 ft × 23 ft). During the 1500s, a large transept addition was added to the south which created a partial cruciform design for the building. Then in 1551, a large transept addition to the north was added, giving the church building a true cruciform design.

In 1814, this church served as an election church (Norwegian: valgkirke). Together with more than 300 other parish churches across Norway, it was a polling station for elections to the 1814 Norwegian Constituent Assembly which wrote the Constitution of Norway. This was Norway's first national elections. Each church parish was a constituency that elected people called "electors" who later met together in each county to elect the representatives for the assembly that was to meet at Eidsvoll Manor later that year.

In the 1820s the church was expanded by constructing a second level gallery for seating. The church was still too small, so in 1858, the building was partially torn down with only the sacristy and choir of the old church remaining for use as a temporary church while the new building was constructed about 50 metres (160 ft) to the northeast of the old church site. The new church was built the same year with a new timber-framed cruciform design. The new church was designed by Christian Heinrich Grosch and it had a tower on the west end. The new building was one of the country's largest churches, seating about 970 people. The remains of the old church were fully torn down after the new church was completed.

On the night of 7 April 1929, the church burned down, barely over 100 years old. Afterwards, planning for a new building began immediately. It was decided that a new, large, stone church would be built on the same site. Arnstein Arneberg was hired to build the new church. It was going to have a cruciform design with about 800 seats. The church is built with reinforced concrete with an exterior covering of stone. The transept on the south side has a large semi-circular apse while the transept on the north side is rectangular. The new building was constructed from 1930 to 1932 and it was consecrated on 1 May 1932 by the Bishop Andreas Fleischer.

== Media gallery ==
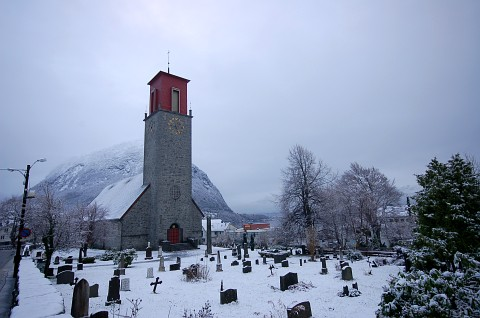

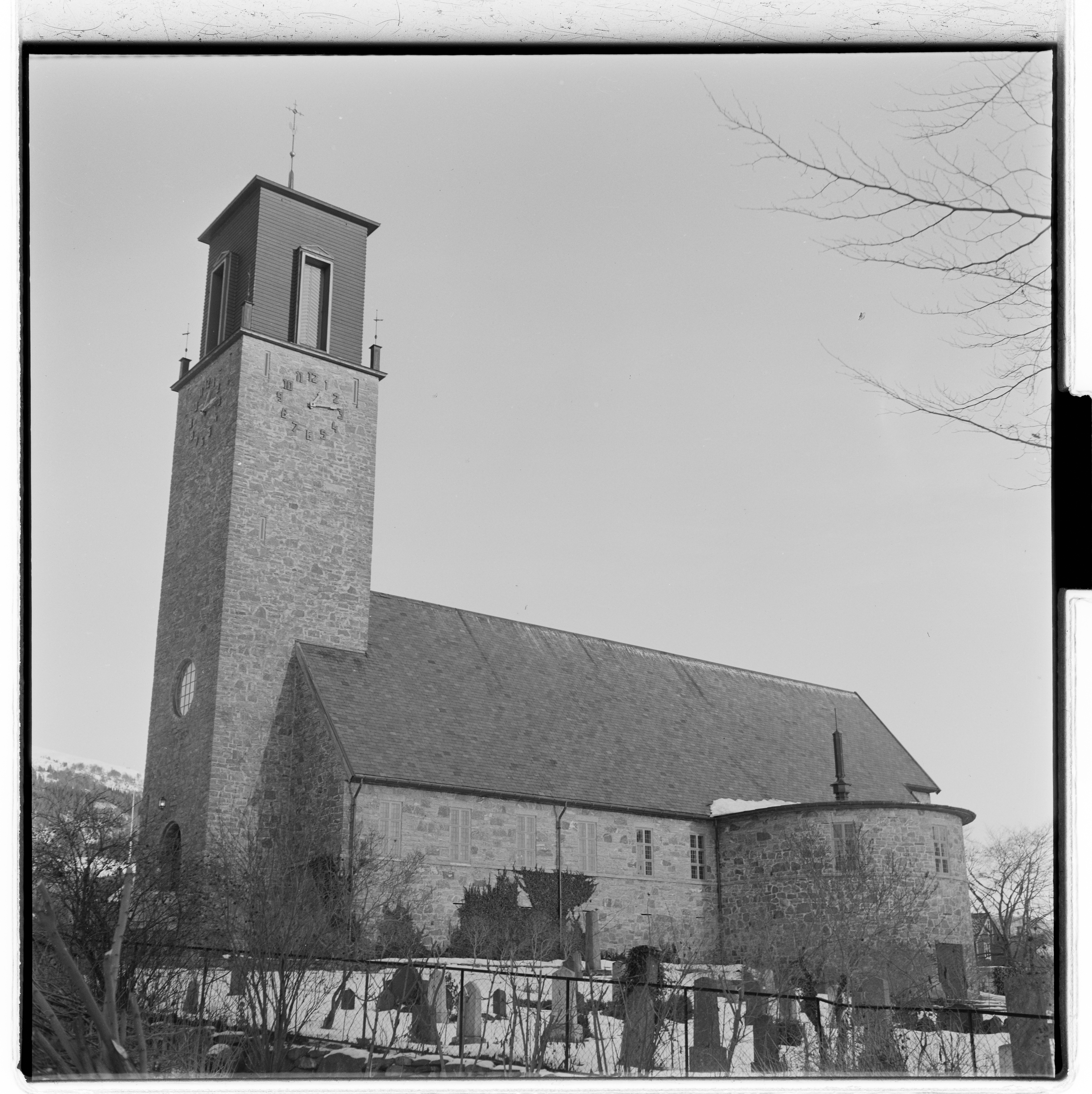

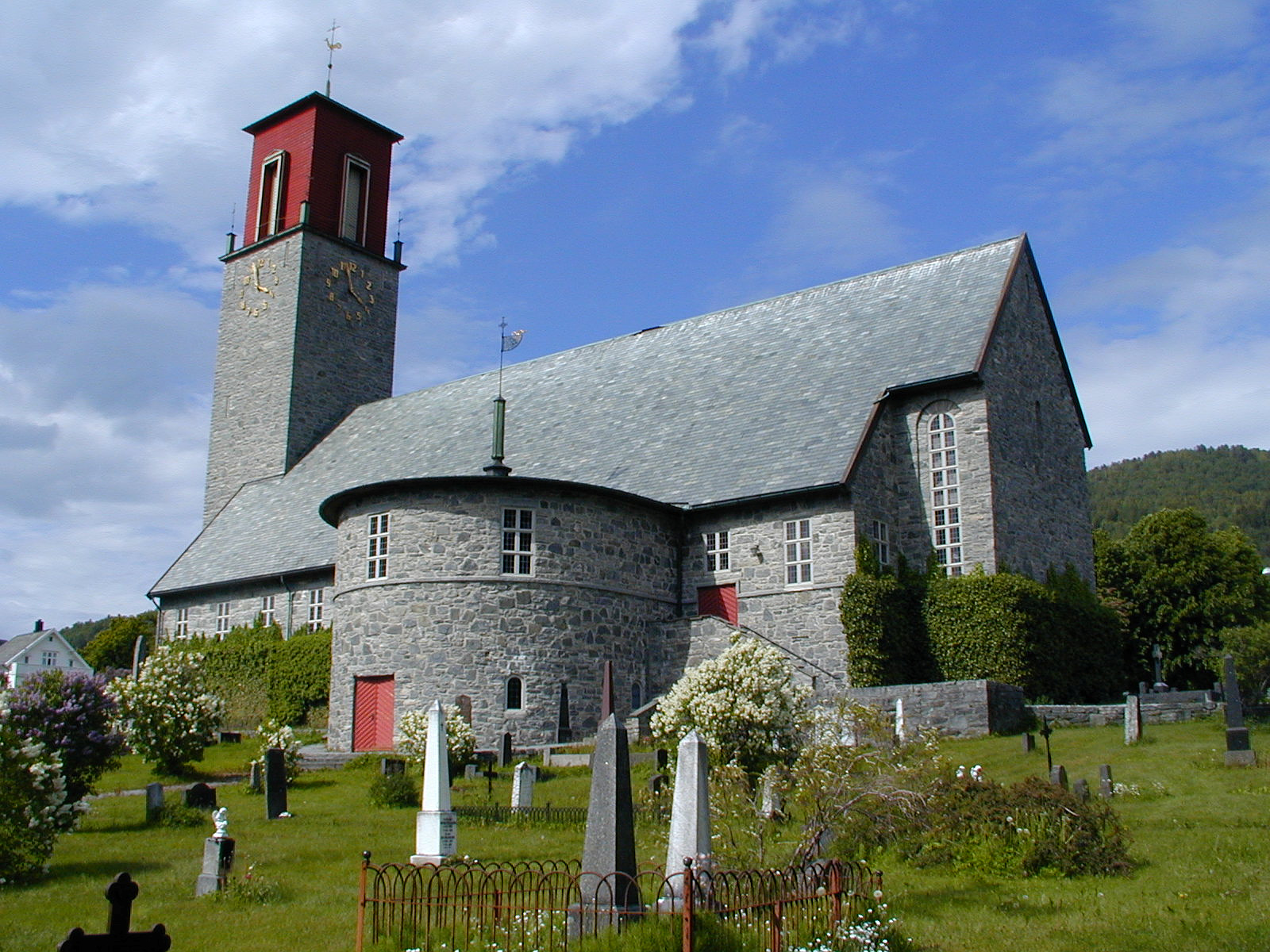

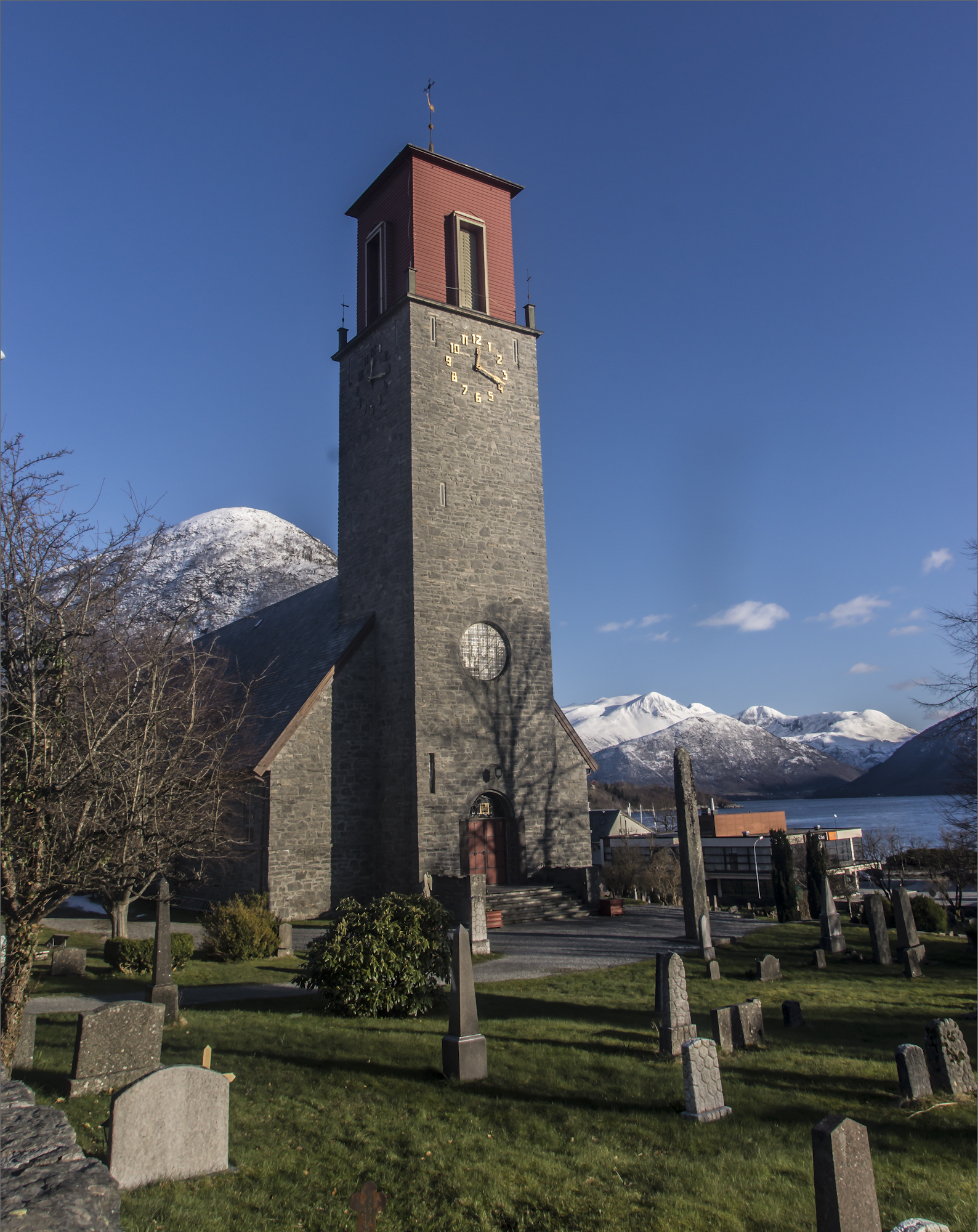

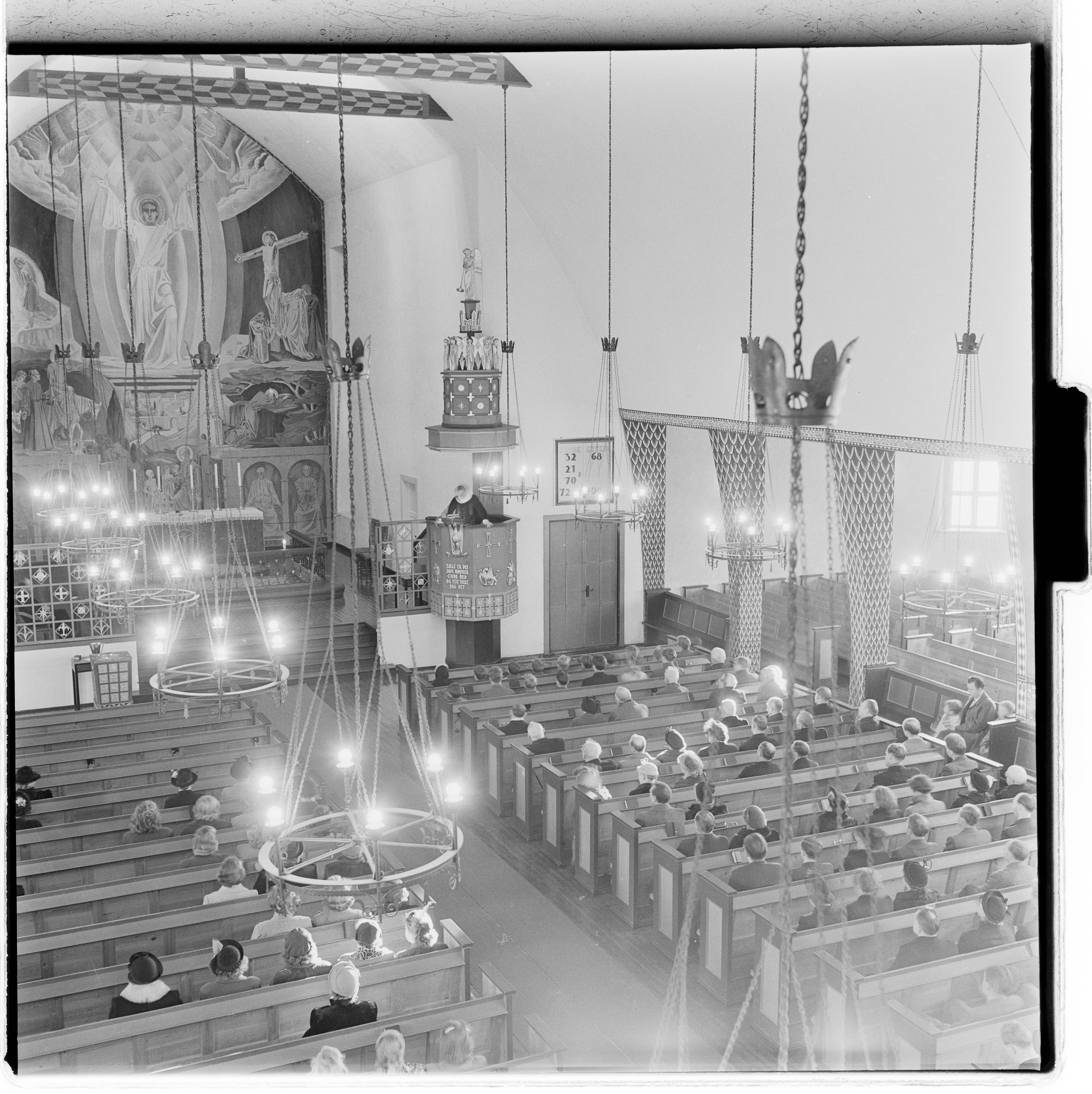

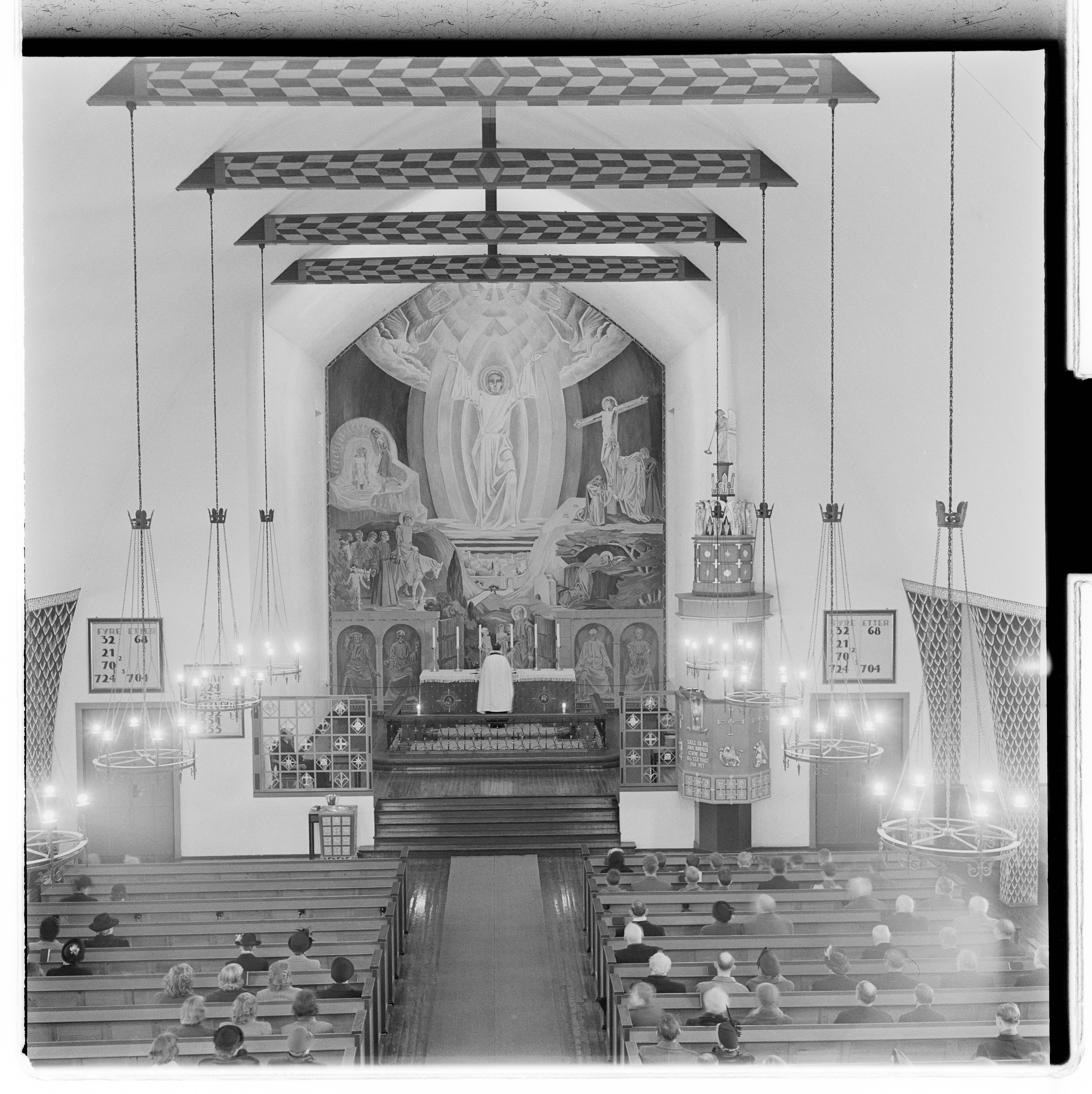

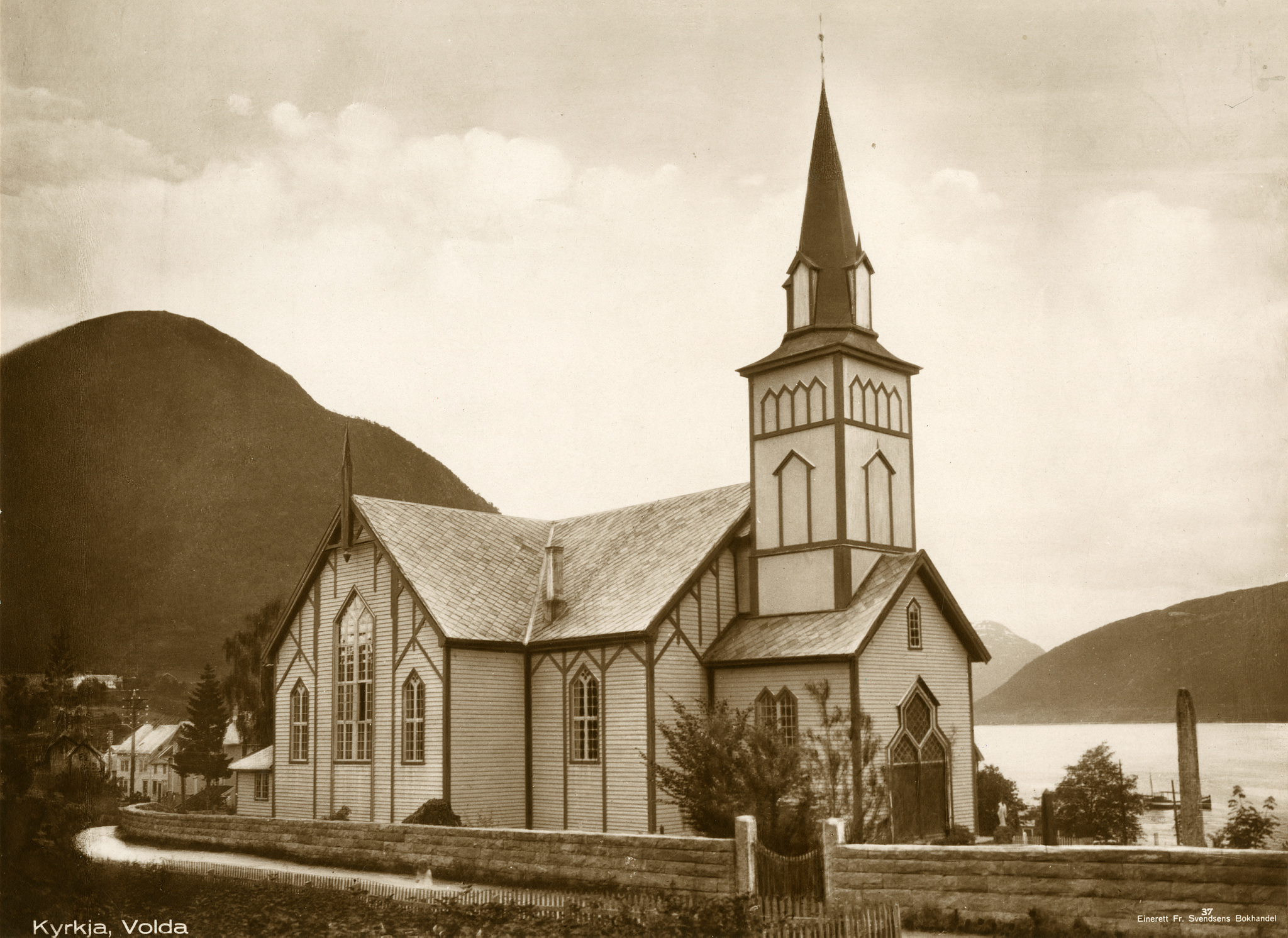
Old church (1858-1929)

== See also ==
- List of churches in Møre
