= Hotel Viking (Newport, Rhode Island) =

Historic hotel in Rhode Island, U.S.

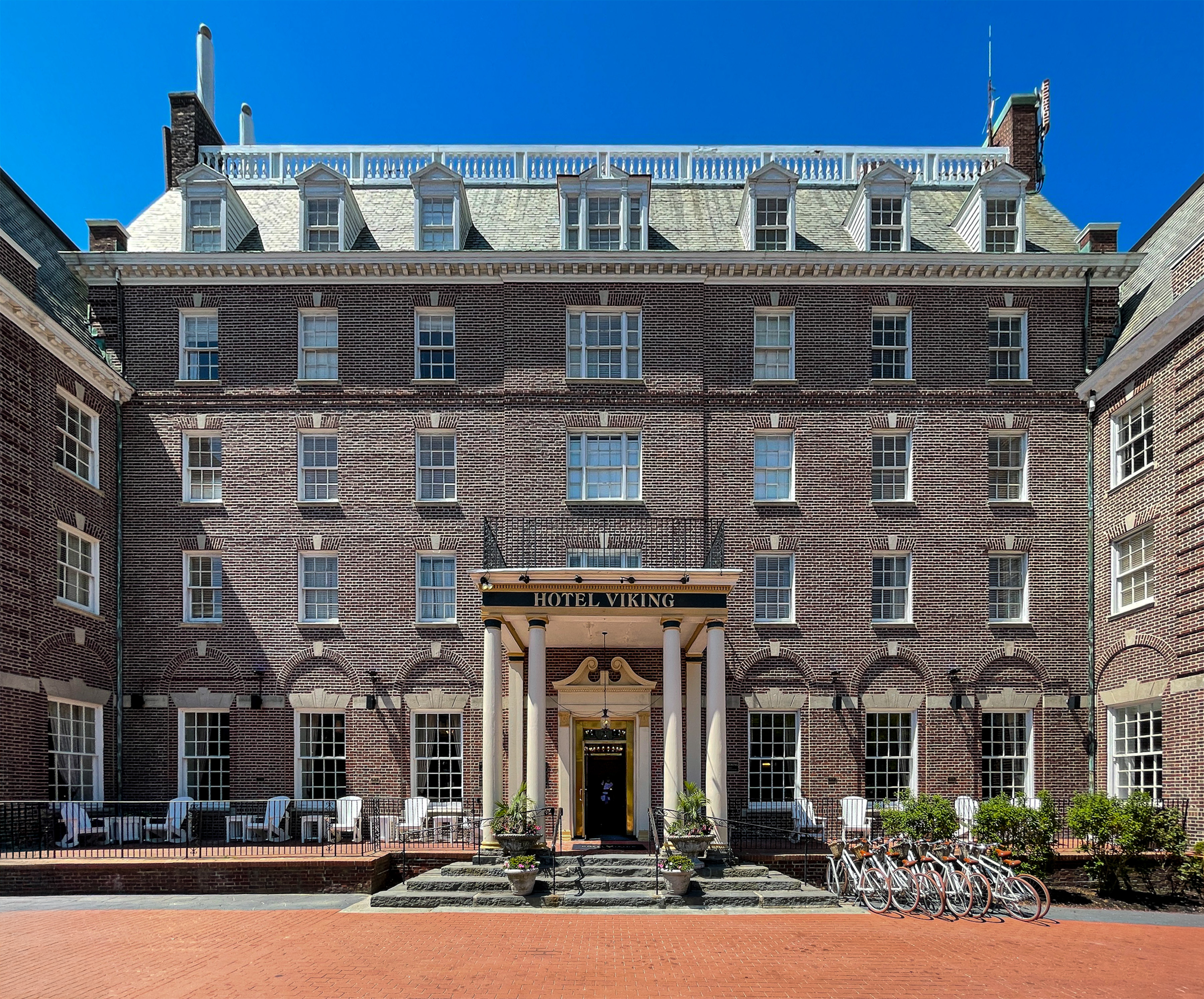
- Hotel Viking in 2021

- Location within Rhode Island Location within the United States

General information
- Architectural style: Colonial Revival
- Location: 1 Bellevue Ave., Newport, Rhode Island
- Coordinates: 41.487463°N 71.309852°W
- Opened: May 25, 1926

The Hotel Viking, or The Hotel Viking, is a historic hotel in Newport, Rhode Island.

== Description ==
It is a five-story Colonial Revival building with, in 2020, 208 rooms or suites. The facility includes a fine-dining restaurant, a lounge, a seasonal bar & kitchen, regular afternoon tea service in its Garden Room, and a spa and sauna.

It is located on Bellevue Avenue, a large part of which is included in the Bellevue Avenue Historic District, listed on the National Register of Historic Places. The Bellevue Avenue Historic District was listed on the National Register of Historic Places in 1972 and was further designated a U.S. National Historic Landmark District in 1976. The district includes The Breakers, which is a Vanderbilt family mansion, and numerous other properties of the Gilded Age era, but not the Hotel Viking. (Note: Historic Hotels of America webpages about the hotel claim that it is included in the Bellevue Avenue Historic District (see "Hotel Viking". "Discover the elegant Colonial-style Hotel Viking, located in the Bellevue Avenue Historic District and within walking distance of the harbor." and see "The Viking Hotel: History -- about the location". "The Hotel Viking is located in the heart of Newport's Bellevue Avenue Historic District, a federally recognized National Historic Landmark.") but those claims appear not to be true. Description of bounds of the district in its 1976 NRHP document explain it goes north along Bellevue Avenue only as far as Memorial Boulevard, which is still south of the hotel.)

== History ==
The hotel opened in 1926. Investors included local businessmen Harry Titus, James O’Connell, and others, as well as summer vacationers in the area such as William H. Vanderbilt, who formed "The American Hotels Corporation" to issue public stock and supervise construction. The hotel was originally built to accommodate guests of Newport's Gilded Age mansions.

An outdoor pool was added in the mid-20th century as part of a major renovation.

During the early years of the Newport Folk and Jazz Festivals, hotel guests included Bob Dylan, Johnny Cash, June Carter Cash, Ella Fitzgerald, Bill Lee, and many other festival performers. U.S. President John F. Kennedy is also said to have stayed at the hotel.

=== Decline and rebirth ===
The addition of a conference center could not stop the hotel's decline into disrepair in the 1960s, when it was briefly known as "The Viking Hotel and Motor Inn".

An $8 million renovation by new owners in the late 1990s brought improvements, and the hotel joined the Historic Hotels of America in 1997. Renovations also occurred in 2007, to restore the rooms to a Gilded Age style, and again in 2016.

North Shore magazine stated in 2021 that the hotel has both historic and modern wings and "looks great for its age".
