= Clarion Hotel The Hub (Oslo) =

Hotel in Oslo, Norway

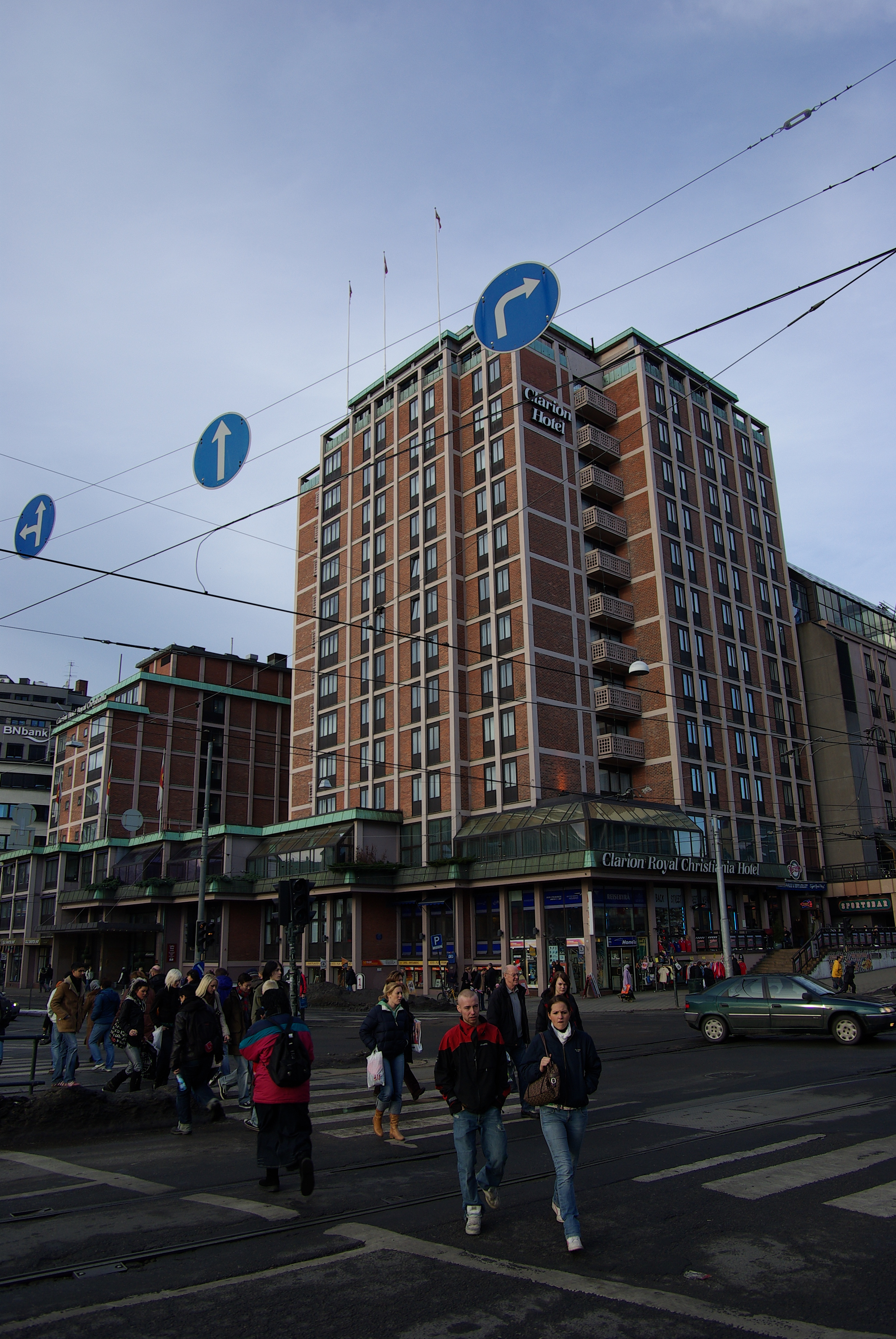
- The hotel before the reconstruction, seen from Jernbanetorget

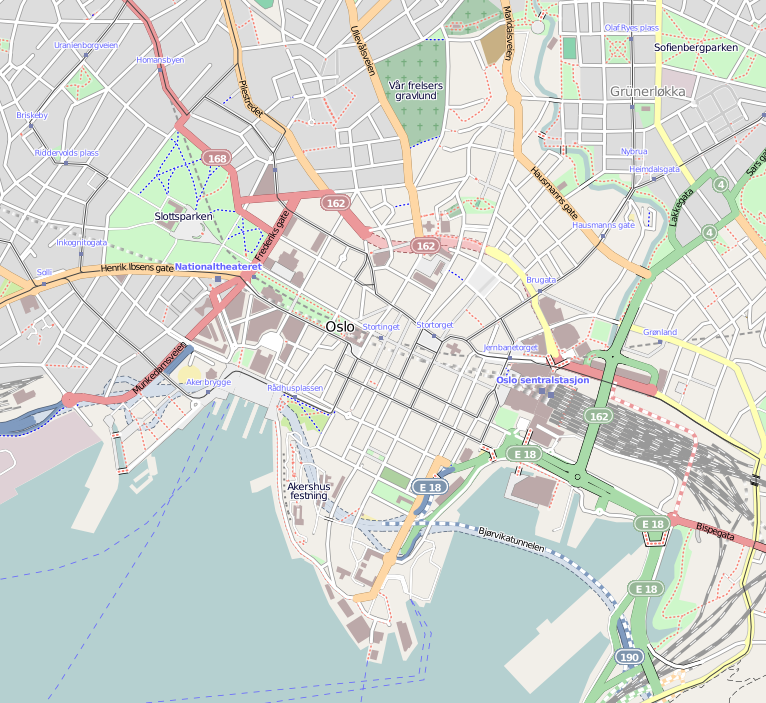
- Location within Central Oslo

General information
- Location: Bishop Gunnerus' gate, Oslo, Norway
- Coordinates: 59.9125739°N 10.7499509°E
- Opening: 1951
- Management: Choice Hotels

Design and construction
- Architect: Lund+Slaatto Arkitekter

Other information
- Number of rooms: 810

Clarion Hotel The Hub is a hotel on Biskop Gunnerus' gate in Oslo, Norway.

== History ==
Formerly known as the Hotel Viking, later as Hotel Royal Christiania, the building was the design work of architects Knut Knutsen and Fredrik Winsnes for which they were awarded the Houen Foundation Award in 1961. The hotel was financed and built by Oslo Municipality to accommodate the 1952 Winter Olympics.

At the time of its formal opening on December 10, 1951, it was the largest hotel in Scandinavia. Today, the hotel remains one of the largest in Norway, with 810 rooms and 24 conference rooms, and is now owned by Strawberry. The hotel has been expanded several times and reopened in March 2019.

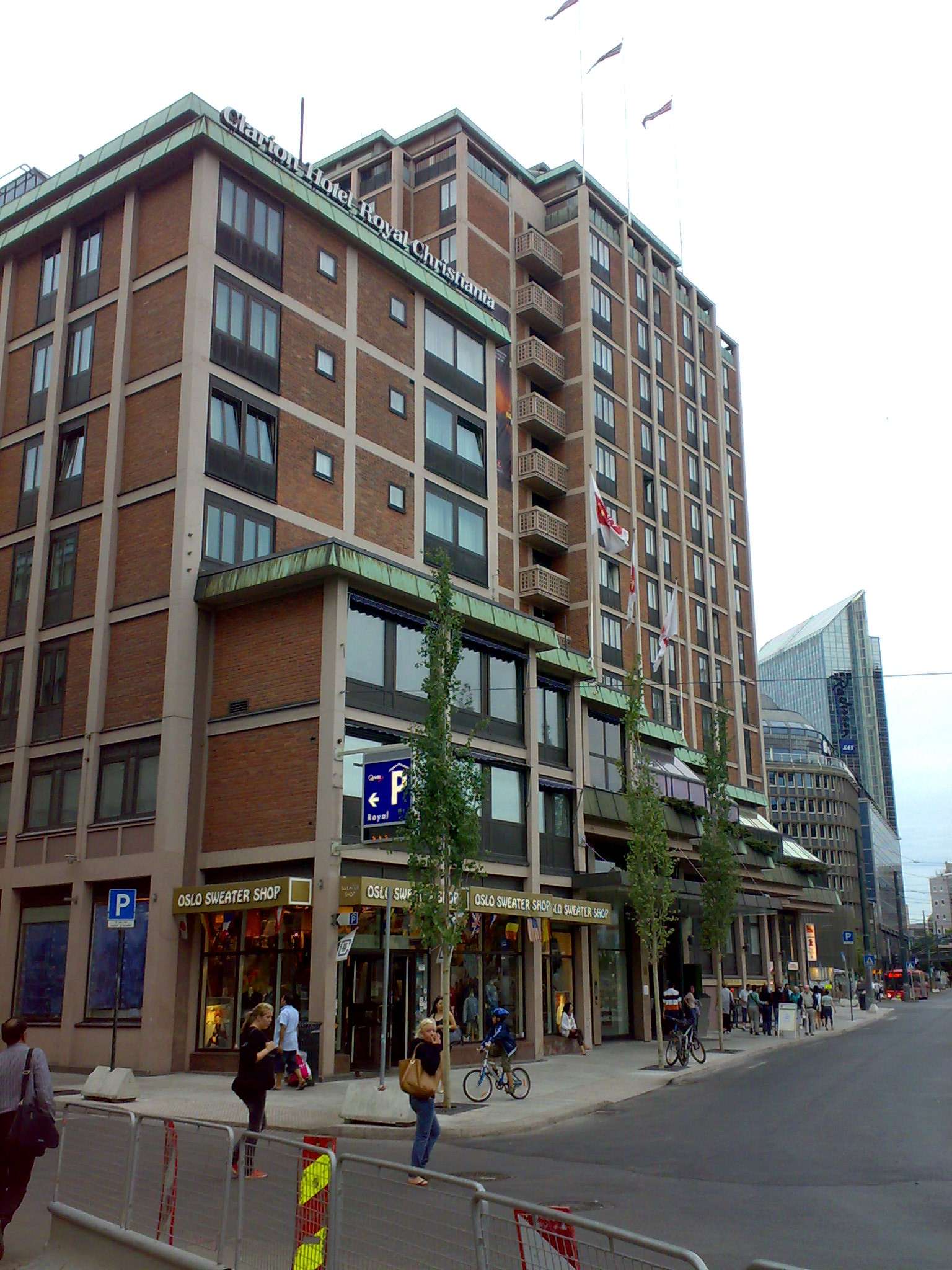
Hotel Royal Christiania

The hotel hosts the prestigious Norwegian music award Spellemannprisen since 2024.
