= Are Vesterlid =

Norwegian architect (1921–2013)

- Born: 28 July 1921; Strinda Municipality, Norway
- Died: 29 August 2013 (aged 92)
- Occupation: Architect
- Parent: Arne Vesterlid

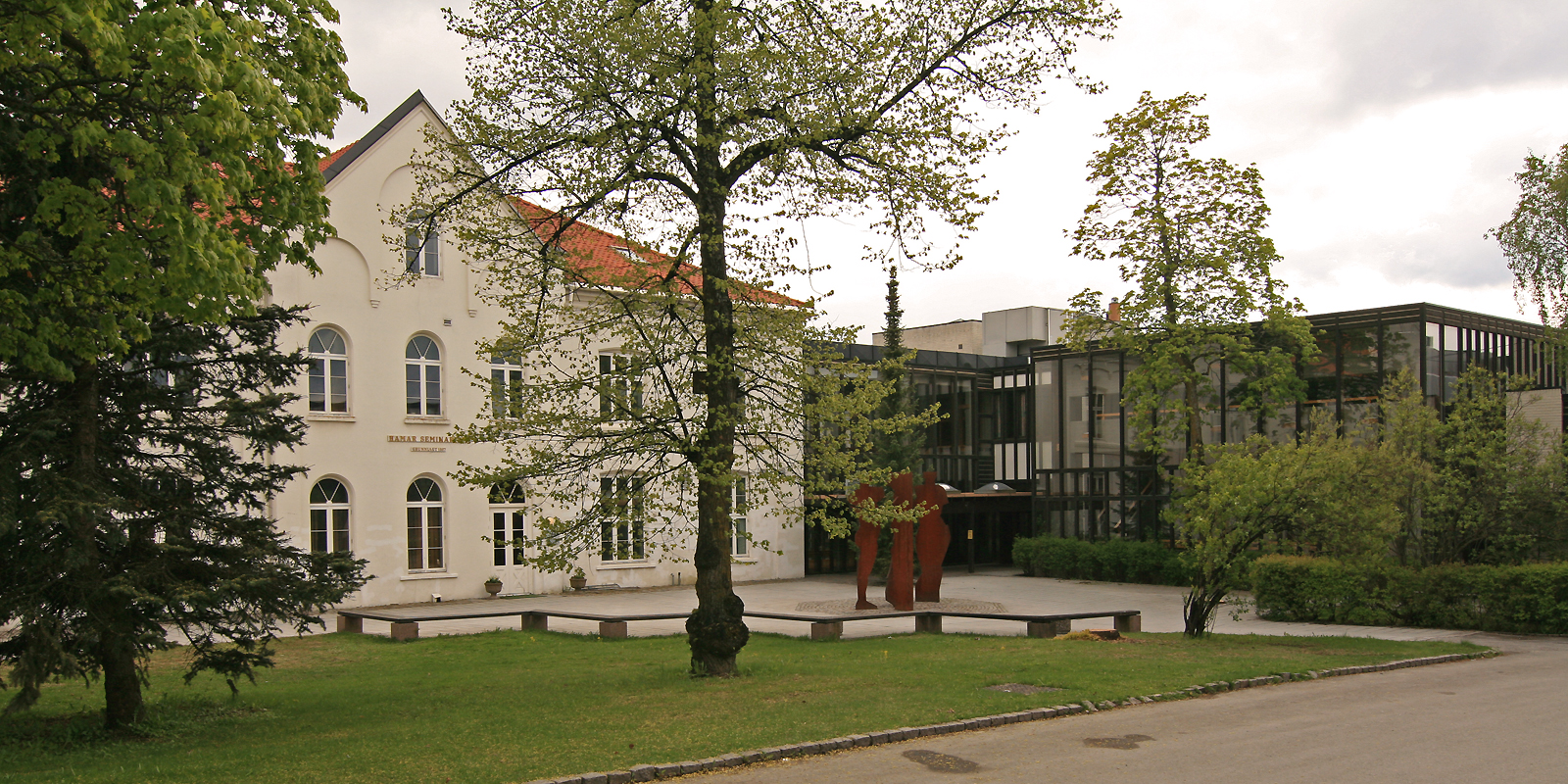
Hamar Seminarium (1877) with appendix to the right designed by Are Vesterlid (1965)

Are Vesterlid (28 July 1921 – 29 August 2013) was a Norwegian architect.

== Biography ==
Vesterlid was born in Strinda Municipality in Sør-Trøndelag, Norway. He was a son of architect Arne Vesterlid (1893–1962) and Gerd Zachariassen (1895–1979). In 1956 he married teacher Gunvor Myhre. His father was employed by the Norwegian National Academy of Craft and Art Industry (now Oslo National Academy of the Arts) where Are Vesterlid graduated in 1944. After graduation, Vesterlid was employed as an assistant to architect Knut Knutsen. From 1947 to 1949, he was employed by Kirsten Sand, district architect in Nord-Troms. In 1953, he graduated from the Cranbrook Academy of Art in Bloomfield Hills, Michigan.

In 1950, Vesterlid started his own architectural practice in Elverum in partnership with interior designer Hans Østerhaug. At the end of the 1950s, the office opened a partnership with architects Finn Bø and Per Torp Ildahl. From 1962, the partnership operated under the name Arkitim. One of their most important works were the townhouses at Furubergveien in Hamar. In 1962, Vesterlid and Hans Østerhaug were awarded the Treprisen for outstanding architectural design.

In 1967, he became a professor at the Oslo School of Architecture and Design where he taught until 1988.
