= Kari Nissen Brodtkorb =

Norwegian architect and educator

Kari Irene Nissen Brodtkorb (born 1942) is a Norwegian architect and educator. Recognized as one of Norway's leading housing designers, in 1994 she was awarded the cherished Houen Foundation Award for her Stranden complex located on Oslo's Aker Brygge. Brodtkorb taught at the Oslo School of Architecture and Design in the early 1990s.

== Biography ==
Born on 3 March 1942 in Oslo, Brodtkorb was the daughter of the business administrator Roald Nissen and Ragnhild Marie Heiding, a secretary. On graduating from the Norwegian Institute of Technology in 1965, she worked as an architect for Harald Hille's firm (1966–71) and for Anker & Hølaas (1977–85) where she became a partner. From 1985, she ran her own firm in Bærum.

She adopted an innovative approach to residential architecture, combining high engineering standards with distinctively attractive designs. Her developments in Oslo, in a white European modernism style, include 30 townhouses on Gullkroken, 110 apartments on Hofftunet and 60 homes in Smestad. Her masterpiece is the Stranden housing complex on Aker Brygge. Completed in 1990, it consists of 120 apartments specially designed for affluent residents. Combining brick with black-painted steel, it draws on the area's shipyard architecture while integrating offices, shops and restaurants. It has been awarded several prizes including the Houen Foundation Award.

After teaching for a period at the Oslo School of Architecture in the early 1990s, she went on to design residential buildings throughout the country. Brodtkorn stands out as an outstanding female architect in a profession dominated by men.

In 2014, together with Kristin Jarmund, Brodtkorb was awarded the Anders Jahres Cultural Prize for her "artistically sensitive designs and her contribution to promoting humane architecture in a socially developmental context".
