= Knut Hjeltnes (architect) =

Norwegian architect (born 1961)

Knut Hjeltnes (born 16 March 1961) is a Norwegian architect.

He was born in Oslo. He took his education at the Norwegian Institute of Technology, and has been appointed as a professor at the Oslo School of Architecture and Design. He adheres to the modernist style, and has been awarded several prizes.
