= Arne Vesterlid =

Norwegian architect (1893–1962)

Are Vesterlid
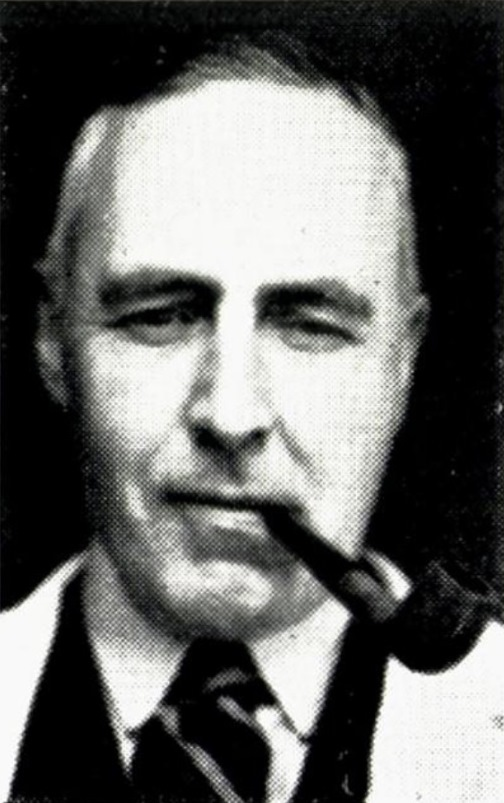
- Born: 6 September 1893; Tromsø, Norway
- Died: 30 October 1962 (aged 69)
- Occupation: Architect
- Spouse: Gerd Zachariassen (1895-1979)
- Children: Are Vesterlid

Arne Vesterlid (6 September 1893 – 30 October 1962) was a Norwegian architect.

He was born in Tromsø in Troms, Norway. His parents were to headmaster Albert Fredrik Johan Vesterlid (1855–1904) and Kristine Marie Espenes (1861–1935). He was married to Gerd Zachariassen (1895-1979) and was the father of architect Are Vesterlid. He graduated from the Norwegian Institute of Technology (NTH) in 1918. He conducted study trips to Gothenburg in 1918; Denmark and Germany in 1930; Hungary and England in 1936. He attended Cranbrook Academy of Art in 1952.

He was an assistant to architect Aksel Guldahl from 1918-1919. He lectured at NTH from 1919 to 1931, and then at the Norwegian National Academy of Craft and Art Industry, where he was appointed rector from 1956. In addition to education, Vesterlid was also running an architecture firm.

== Selected works ==
- Victoria kino at Karl Johans gate 35 in Oslo (ca. 1930)
- Lysholmgården at Olav Tryggvason gate 26 in Trondheim (1932–33)
- Müllers hotell at Nordre gate 24 in Trondheim (1934)
- Handelsstandens hus at Dronningens gate 12 in Trondheim (1934)
