= Norwegian Metrology Service =

- Company type: Government agency
- Industry: Metrology
- Founded: 1876
- Headquarters: Kjeller, Norway
- Area served: Norway
- Parent: Norwegian Ministry of Trade and Industry
- Website: www.justervesenet.no

Norwegian Metrology Service (Norwegian: Justervesenet) is a Norwegian government agency responsible for metrology. Its main responsibility is to ensure that all measuring equipment in Norway is trusted nationally and internationally. The agency is subordinate to the Norwegian Ministry of Trade and Industry and was established in 1876. Its current name has been used since 1988.

== See also ==
- Outline of metrology and measurement
