= Kristin Jarmund =

Norwegian architect

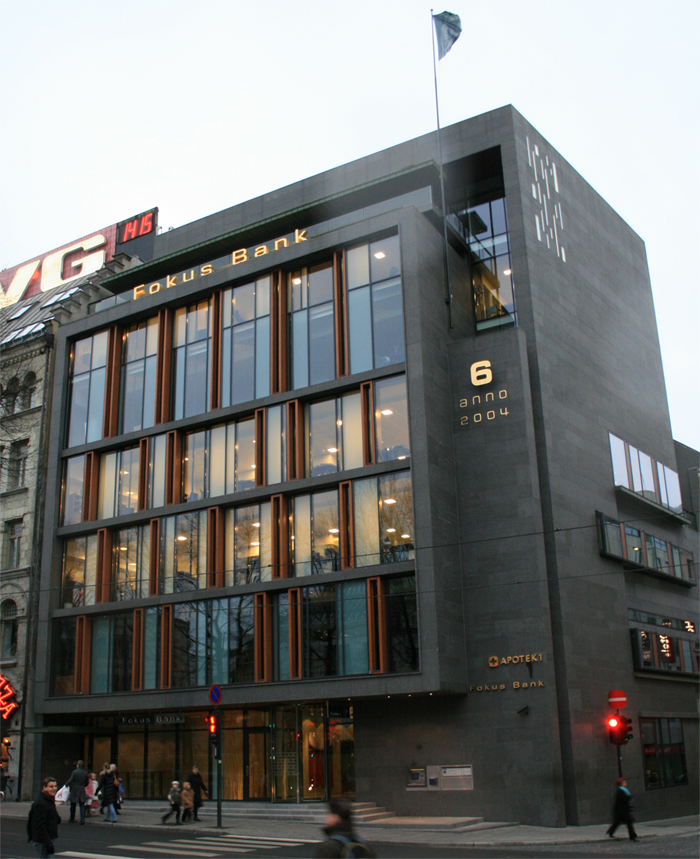
Stortingsgata 6 in Oslo, Fokus Bank, was drawn by Kristin Jarmund

.

Kristin Jarmund (born 26 September 1954) is a Norwegian architect.

== Education, career and awards ==
Jarmund is a graduate of the Norwegian Technical University in Trondheim (Norwegian Institute of Technology) and the Architectural Association School of Architecture. From 1978 to 1983 she was employed at Telje-Torp-Aasen Arkitektkontor. In 1985 she started her own practice through Kristin Jarmund Arkitekter. The office was among Norway's leading offices and has won or been placed highly in several competitions. For Justervesenet's (Norwegian Metrology Service) new building at Kjeller, the office was awarded the Houens Foundation Award (Houens fonds diplom).

Jarmund's work is characterized by clear and simple form, often described as "new-functionalism". Her design language of remarkable clarity is evident in both color and in the attention to detail. A distinct quality in Jarmund's work is the importance given to the interior spaces. Jarmund has used the expression "the inner façade" to emphasize the design of the indoor spaces.

Multipurpose urban buildings and educational structures stand out in her range of works, including the schools Benterud in Lørenskog, Gulskogen in Drammen and Stensby Kindergarten in Eidsvoll (1994), for which Jarmund was selected to represent Norway in the 1996 Venice Biennale as part of the "Nordic Light" exhibit.

Her work is sought after by both private clients and national institutions. The office has carried out a number of projects for the renovation of public spaces, including one in Majorstuhuset (1998); Oslo New Theatre (1995) and the National Gallery (2004), the Nydalen Metro Station (2003) Nydalen Station, the headquarters of Fokus Bank at Stortingsgaten 6 (2005), the National Dental Faculty in Bergen (2012), the Norwegian Embassy building in Kathmandu (2008) Norwegian Embassy in Kathmandu, the residence of the Norwegian ambassador in Nepal (2012) and the Norwegian Embassy in Nairobi (ongoing), showing in each of these "a perfect blend of classic and modern".

As an interior designer, her significant works include the Bar and Restaurant located in the 1930s neoclassical building at Majorstuen in Oslo (Majorstuhuset), the New Café of the National Gallery in Oslo (2002), an honourable mention for her lighting design by Norwegian Lighting Award; the new offices of TV Norge in Oslo (2010), the headquarters of the Rasmussen Group in Kristiansand (2004) and the Boston Consulting Group (2009). In the original Nydalen Metro Station (2003), which also received a nomination for the Mies van der Rohe award, the art project "The Tunnel of Light" was incorporated.

In 2011, she was named an «Honorary Fellow» of The American Institute of Architects (AIA) for outstanding contributions to the architectural profession and society. Only three Norwegians, Sverre Fehn (1986), as well as Kjell Lund and Nils Slaatto (1996), have received the award previously, and later Reiulf Ramstad (2016)

Her work has been widely recognized at the national and international level. A monograph of her works in English and Norwegian was published in 2008, with essays by Kenneth Frampton and Bente Sand. More recently the book «In service of undiscovered life - Kristin Jarmund Architects» (2019) was published, with essays by Aaron Betsky and Kjetil T. Trædal.

In 2014, she was awarded the Anders Jahres kulturpris.

Jarmund is the sister of the architect Einar Jarmund.

== Kristin Jarmund Arkitekter (Nordic Office of Architecture) ==
The firm was established in 1985 with Kristin Jarmund as professional manager including Ola Helle, Geir Messel, Graeme Ferguson and Jonathan Alexander as partners. In 2022 Kristin Jarmund Arkitekter was merged with Nordic Office of Architecture and now functions as an integrated part of the office, with Kristin Jarmund as partner/creative director.

A selection of the office's work:

- Fyrstikkterrassen, office building in Helsfyr (Svovelstikka 1-3), Oslo (1991)
- Stensby Kindergarten, Eidsvoll (1994) – exhibited at the Venice Bennale of Architecture, 1996.
- Office and laboratory building for Justervesenet (Norwegian Metrology Service), Kjeller (1997) – Houens fonds diploma
- Gulskogen School in Drammen (2001)
- New Café in the French Hall of the National Gallery (2002); new bookshop (2004)
- Nydalen Metro Station (2003) (nominated for the Mies van der Rohe award)
- Reconstruction of the office building for the Rasmussen group, Kirkegata 1, Kristiansand (2004)
- Råholt Secondary School (2004) – Designers Saturday Award (Best Norwegian Interior) – Statens byggeskikkpris (the State's building practice award); honorable mention
- Stortingsgata 6 (Fokus Bank among others) (2005) – Statens byggeskikkpris (the State's building practice award); honorable mention.
- Interior for Akademika bookshop at BI in Nydalen (2005)
- Bergenhus School, Rakkestad (2006)
- «The Treasury», Sandvika (2007)
- Head office for the Eitzen Group at Tjuvholmen in Oslo (2007)
- Redevelopment of Kongens gate 5 into the design hotel Grims Grenka, Oslo (2008)
- Sogn Arena office building, Oslo (2008)
- Norwegian embassy building in Kathmandu, Nepal (2008) – Ambassador's Residence (2012)
- Gjerdrum Secondary School (2009) – Statens byggeskikkpris (the State's building practice award) 2010
- «Magpie's Nest» at Vestlandske artindustry-museum in Bergen (exhibition area for silver art) (2009)
- Offices for TV Norge in Nydalen, Oslo (2010)
- Westerdals School of Communication in the Vulkan area by Akerselva in Oslo (2011)
- National Dental Faculty, (University of Bergen) Bergen (2012)
- Entrance pavilion for the Natural History Museum, at Tøyen in Oslo (2014)
- «Troldsalen», new concert hall at Edvard Grieg's home Troldhaugen near Bergen (2015)
- The square building in Nydalen, Oslo (2016)
- Extension of Nydalen Metro Station, Oslo (2016)
- Kvartal 57, apartment building in Kristiansand (2017)
- Kvartal 42, multi-purpose building in Kristiansand (2017)
- The «Winecastle», redevelopment of Vinmonopolet's former distillery in Hasle into a shopping center and apartments (2020) – nominated for Oslo city's architecture award (2021)
- Office building at Schweigaardsgate 35-51 (ongoing)
- The Norwegian Embassy in Nairobi, Kenya (ongoing)
- Biskop Gunnerus Gate 14B, high-rise building for KLP in Oslo S (under planning with C.F. Møller Arkitekter and Rodeo Architects)

== Literature ==
- Bente Sand: «Med vilje til form» in Arkitektur in Norway – yearbook 1999
- Knut Randem: «Deilig fargesterk», Internet article
- Kenneth Frampton, Per Maning, Bente Sand: «Norske arkitekter, Kristin Jarmund» - 2008
- Aaron Betsky, Kjetil Thorsen, Trædal: «In service of undiscovered life - Kristin Jarmund Architects» - 2019
