= Magnus Poulsson =

Norwegian architect (1881–1958)

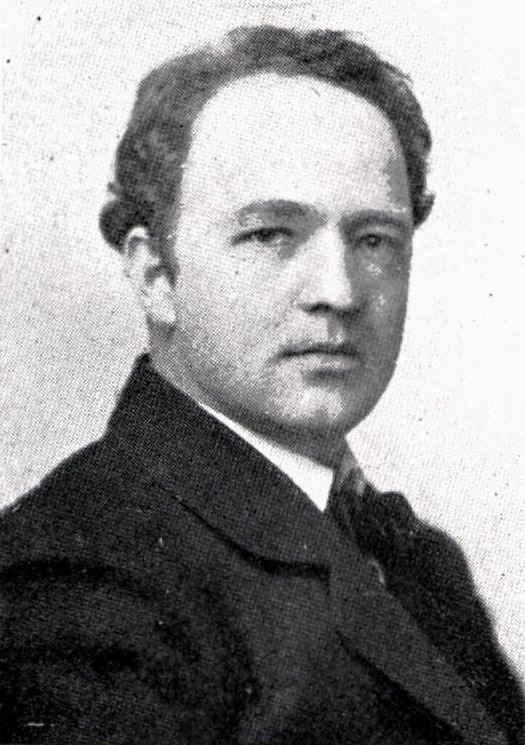
Magnus Poulsson

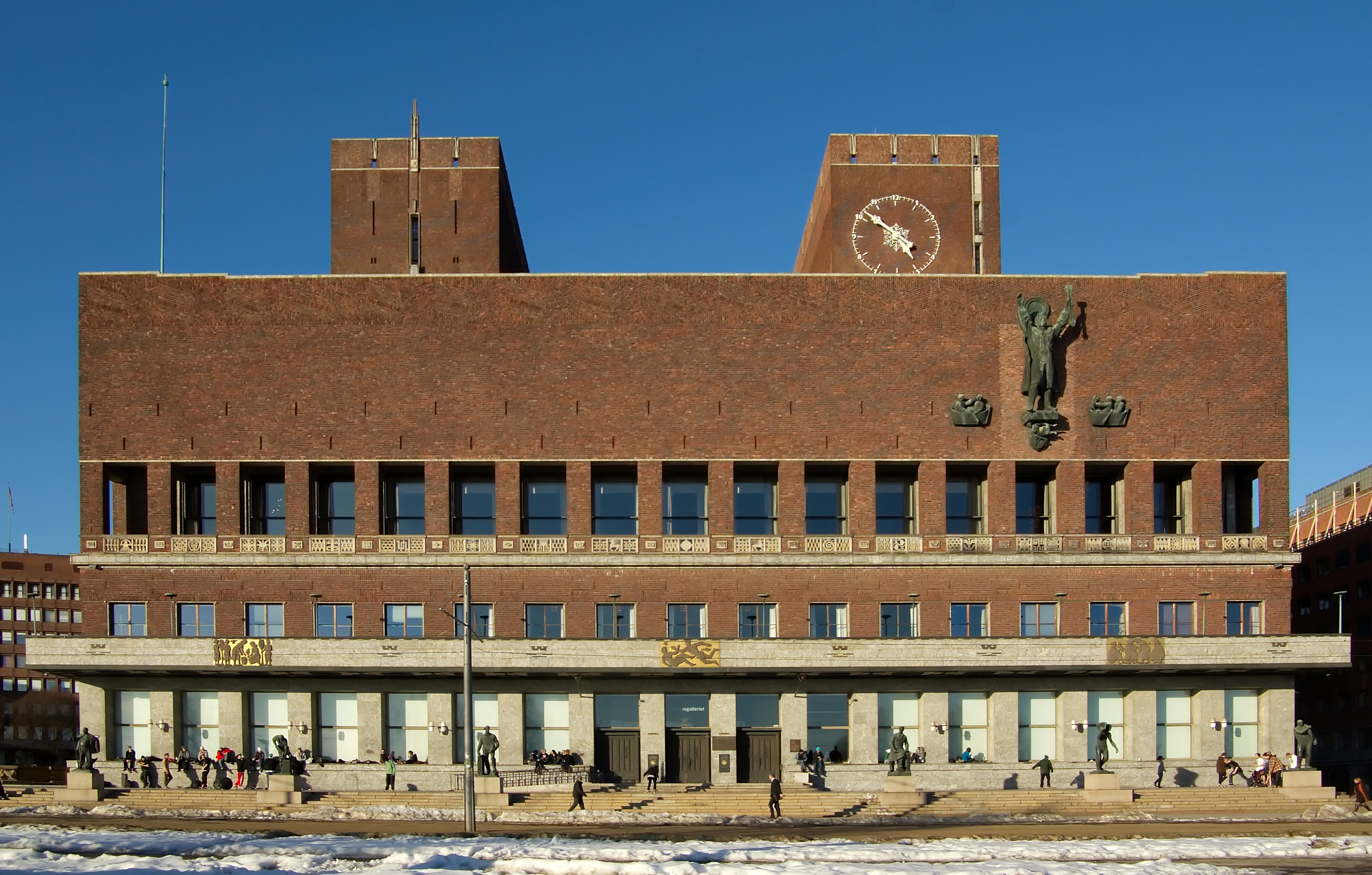
Oslo City Hall

Magnus Poulsson (14 July 1881 – 18 March 1958) was a Norwegian architect.

== Early life and education ==
Magnus Poulsson was born in Drammen, Buskerud, Norway, on 14 July 1881. His parents were Søren Anton Poulsson (1847–1934) and Ina Bolette Jørgensen (1851–1922). His brother Jens Jørgensen Poulsson was father of artist Else Poulsson and Colonel Jens-Anton Poulsson.

Poulsson studied at Den kongelige Tegne- og Kunstskole i Christiania, now the Norwegian National Academy of Craft and Art Industry in Oslo from 1900 to 1903, at the Royal Institute of Technology in Stockholm from 1903 to 1905 and apprenticed from 1905 to 1909.

== Career ==
Poulsson established his own practice in Oslo during 1909 and worked closely with Arnstein Arneberg.

Magnus Poulsson is most famous for designing the Oslo City Hall, together with Arnstein Arneberg. He is also known for his work on Bærum City Hall (Bærum Rådhus) in Sandvika (1925 and 1958), KNA Hotel in Oslo (1931), Eystein church in Hjerkin and Haslum Chapel in Bærum. Poulsson's work also included private residences, office buildings, churches and interiors. Magnus Poulsson was particularly known for recreating the tradition of Norwegian folk wooden architecture.

Poulsson was chairman of the Ancient Monuments Society 1917–1930 and chairman of the supervisory committee for the Nidaros Cathedral reconstruction from 1931 to 1958. He was an honorary member of the Danish AKAD and a member of the Swedish Royal Academies for Fria Art Erna.

== Awards ==
- Houen Foundation Award – Det Forenede Dampskibs-Selskab, Karl Johans gate 1, Oslo (1925)
- Houen Foundation Award – Bærum Rådhus, Sandvika (1930)
- Commander of the Royal Norwegian Order of St. Olav (1950)
- Medal of St. Hallvard (1956)
