= Arnstein Arneberg =

Norwegian architect

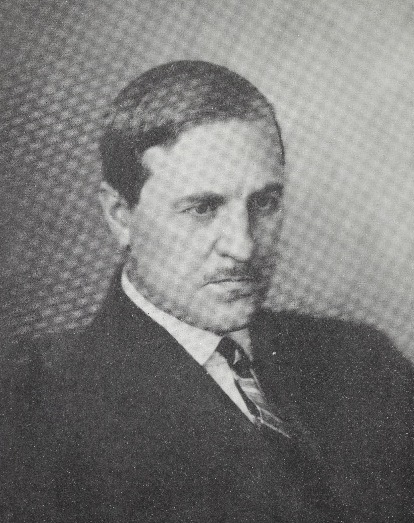
- Born: Arnstein Rynning Arneberg; 6 July 1882; Fredrikshald, Norway
- Died: 6 September 1961 (aged 79); Biri, Norway
- Education: Royal Institute of Technology
- Occupation: architect
- Spouses: Aagot Skavlan (b. 1888–1960); Eva Reimers (b. 1901–1987)
- Awards: Medal of St. Hallvard; Prince Eugen Medal; Order of St. Olav; Order of the Polar Star

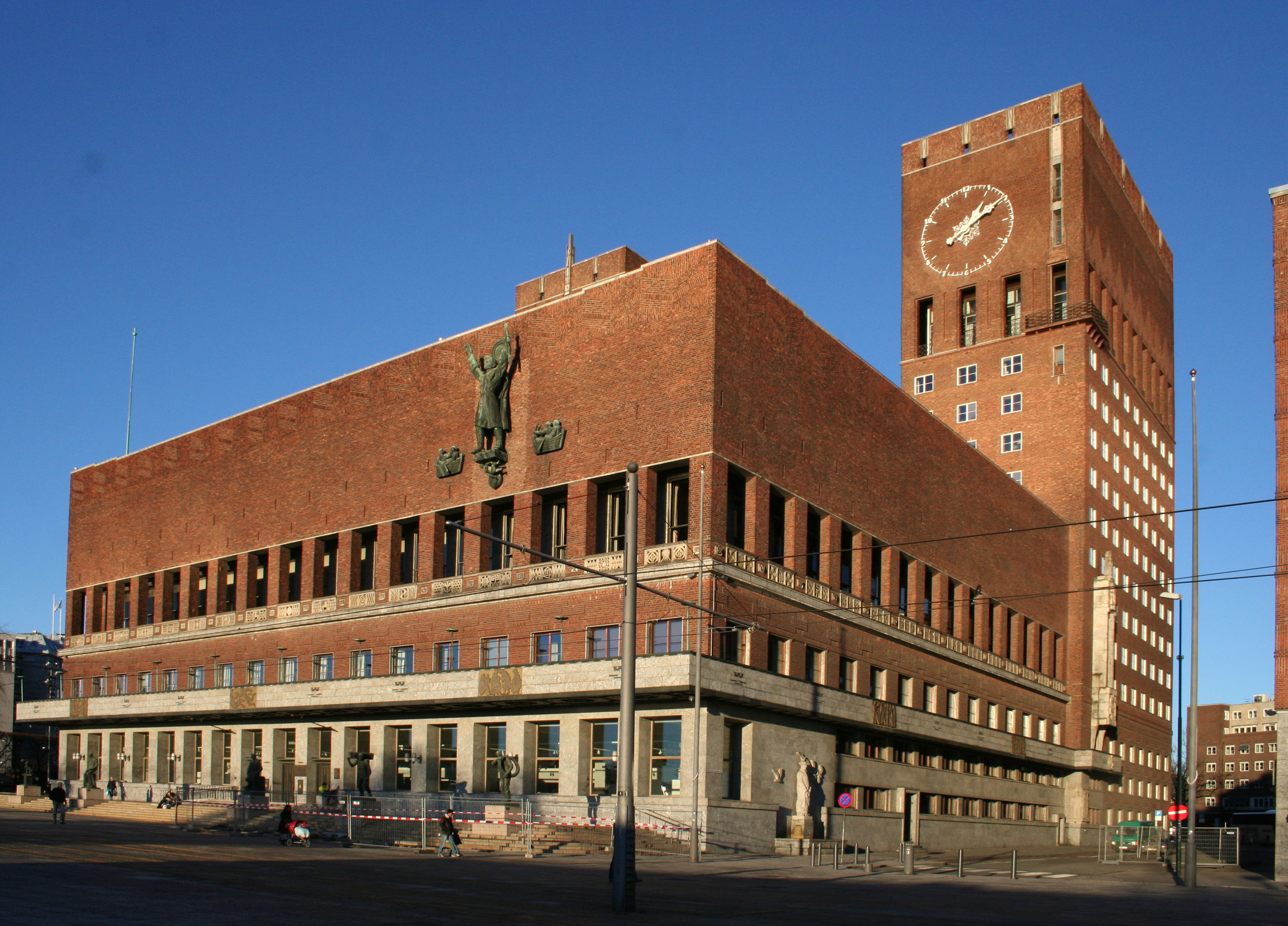
Oslo City Hall

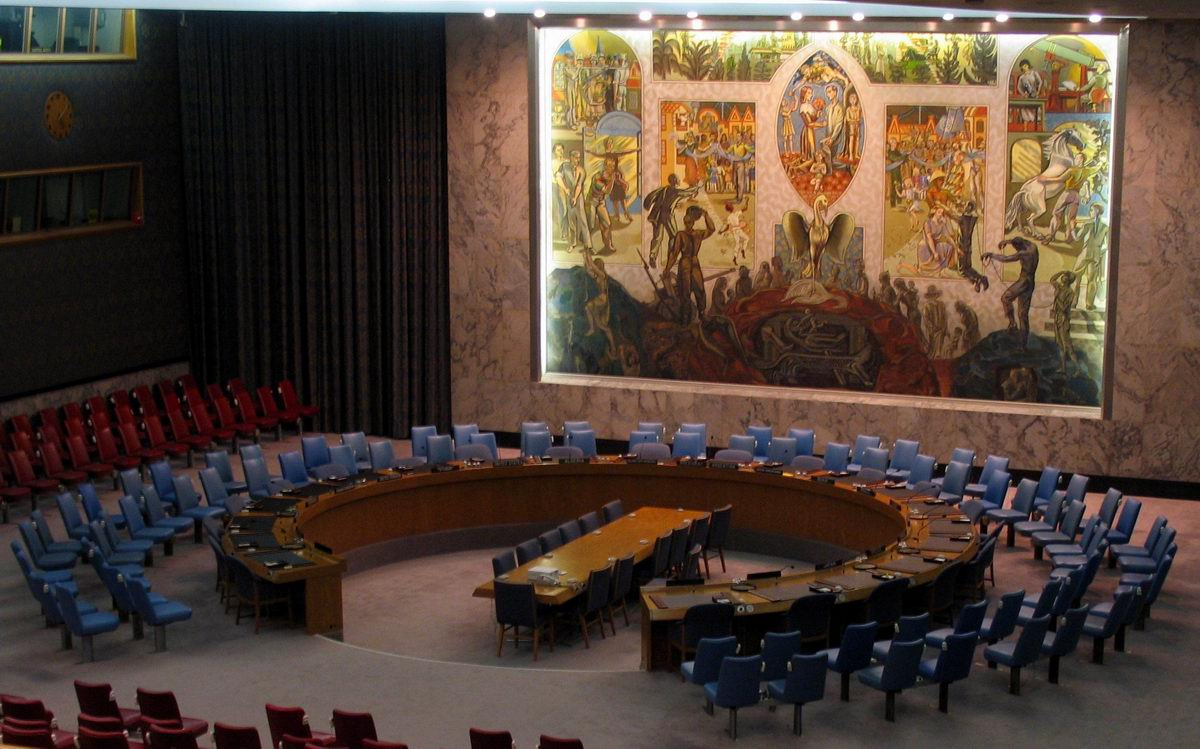
Interior of the UN Security Council

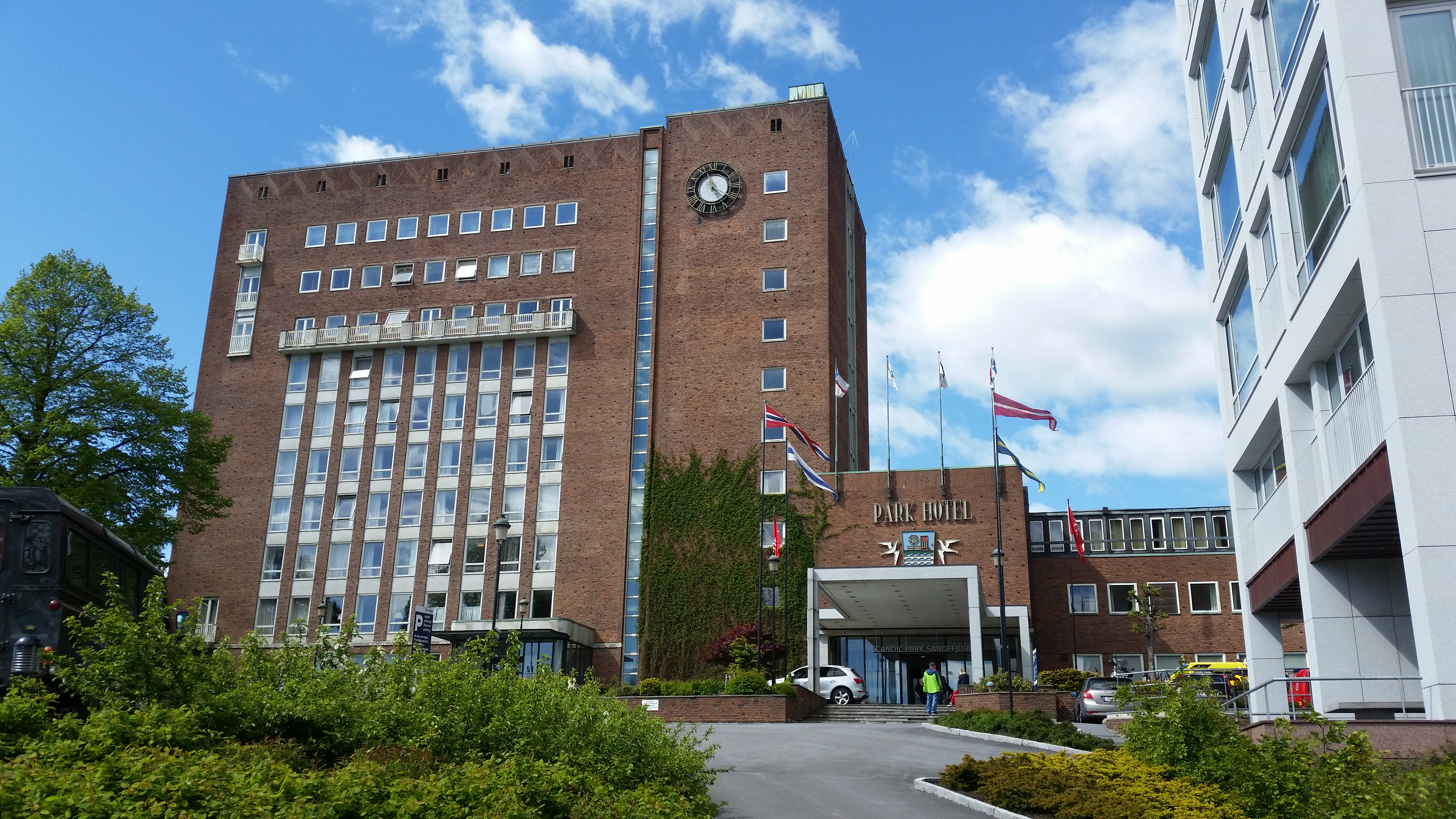
Park Hotel, Sandefjord

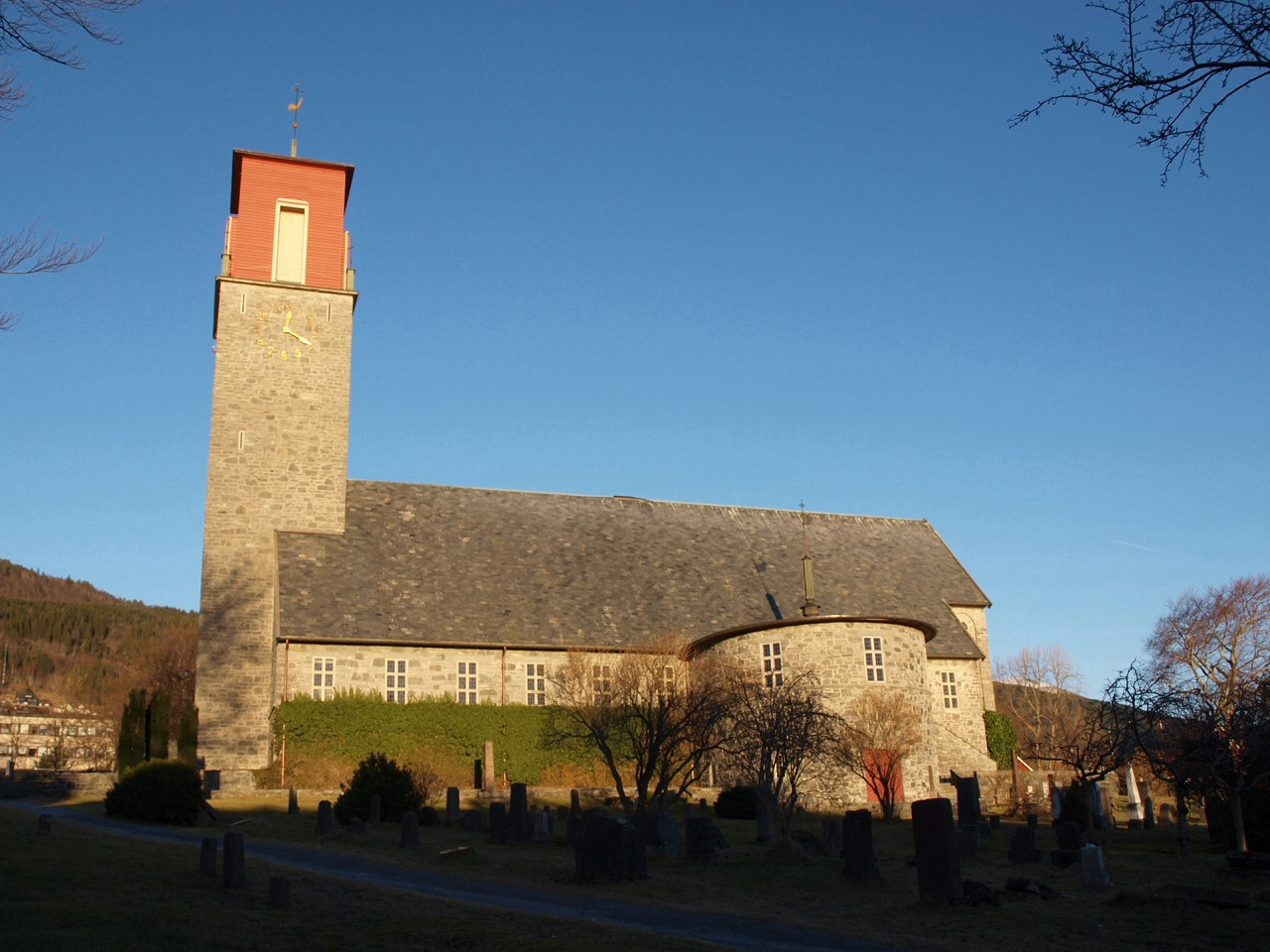
Volda Church

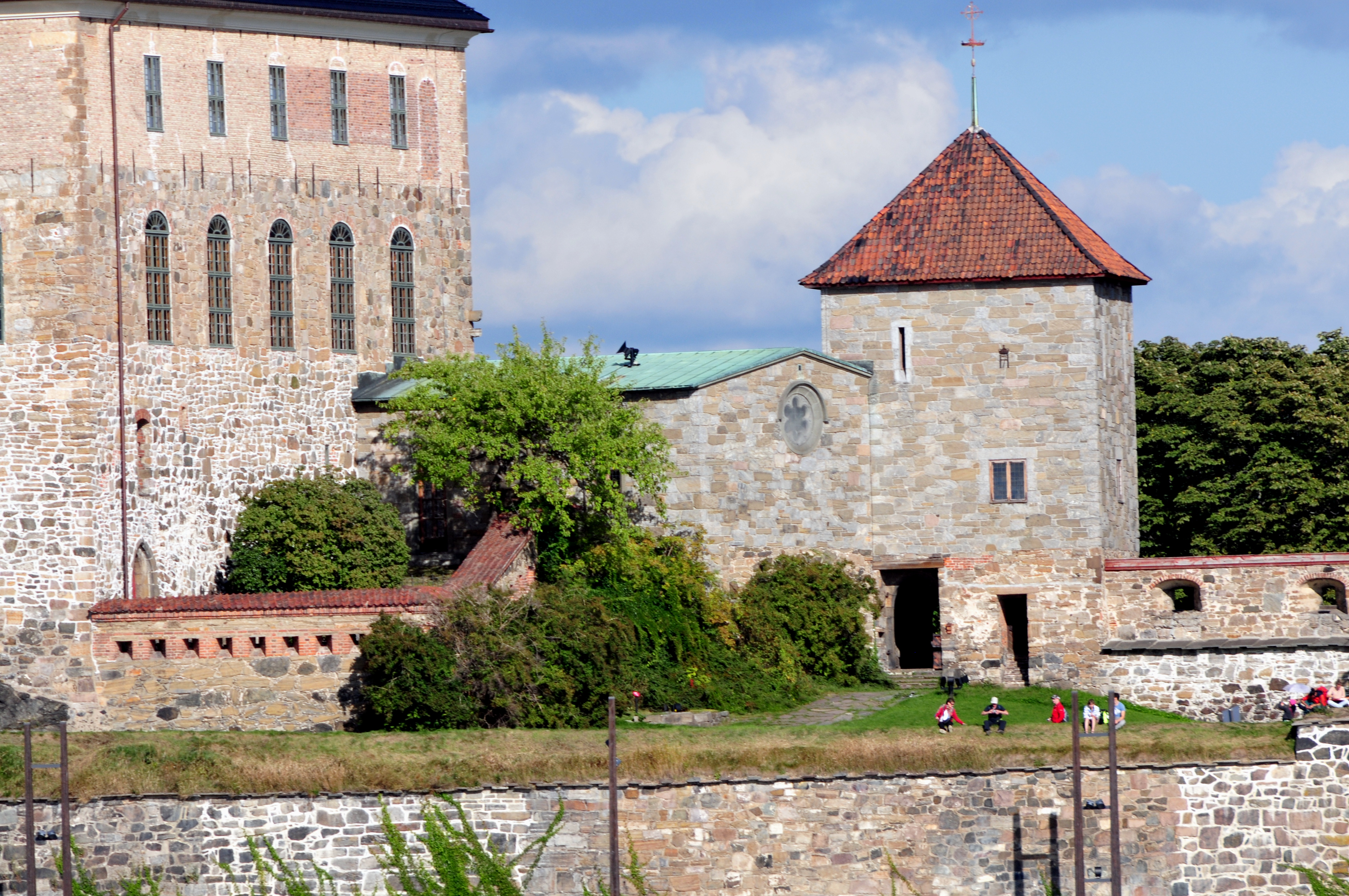
Royal Mausoleum in Oslo

Arnstein Rynning Arneberg (6 July 1882 – 9 June 1961) was a Norwegian architect. He was active professionally for 50 years and is often considered the leading architect in Norway of his time.

== Personal life ==
Arnstein Rynning Arneberg was born in Fredrikshald (now Halden) as a son of factory manager Mauritz Otto Edward Arneberg (1845–1913) and Hermione Nicoline Mathilde Rynning (1858–1944). Arneberg grew up in Lysaker in Oslo.

In 1910, he married Aagot Kielland Skavlan (1888–1960), a daughter of professor Olaf Skavlan. After the marriage was dissolved in 1923 Arneberg married Eva Elisabeth Reimers (1901–1987). A daughter from the first marriage, ceramicist Gro Skavlan Arneberg, was married to economist and politician Egil Lothe.

== Education ==
From 1899 to 1902, he was a student at the Royal Drawing School, now the Norwegian National Academy of Craft and Art Industry in Oslo. Arneberg began his education of the architect with employment as assistant to the architect, Alfred Christian Dahl (1857–1940) in Oslo from 1888 to 1900. Arneberg studied at the Royal Institute of Technology in Stockholm from 1904 to 1906. He also studied with Swedish architects Isak Gustaf Clason, Gustaf Lindgren, and Erik Lallerstedt. In Stockholm, he studied with a group of Norwegian architect students who came to be influential in the academic environment, including Magnus Poulsson.

== Career ==
In 1908, Arneberg established his own architectural practice. He and architect Ole Andreas Sverre (1865–1952) worked as partners on Arneberg's earliest works, including a proposal for the Royal Lodge (Kongsseteren) at Voksenkollen, outside Oslo. As an independent architect, Arneberg's work included a large array of residences, office buildings, churches, railroad stations, and interiors.

He is best known for his work on the Oslo City Hall (with Magnus Poulsson) and interior design of the UN Security Council in New York City. He is also known for his work on the Viking Ship Museum in Bygdøy, built for the Oseberg ship, which was completed in 1926, as well as Skaugum, the official residence of the Crown Prince and Crown Princess of Norway.

== Awards ==
Arneberg was one of the first recipients of the Medal of St. Hallvard in 1956 and was awarded the Prince Eugen Medal in 1960. He was named a Commander with Star of the Order of St. Olav and received the King Haakon VII's Jubilee Medal and the King Haakon VII's Commemorative Medal in gold. He was made a commander of the Order of the Polar Star and was elected a member of the Royal Swedish Academy of Arts in Stockholm.

The Østfold Architectural Association (ØAF) named the Arnstein Arneberg Prize (Arnstein Arnebergprisen) in his honor. The prize was first awarded for the 50-year anniversary of the ØAF in 2008.

== Selected works ==
- Volda Church, Møre og Romsdal – 1929–32
- Viking Ship Museum (Oslo) – 1926–1932
- Uranienborg Church, Oslo (interior design) – 1930
- Akershus Castle (restored and rebuilt) – 1932–1948
- The Royal Mausoleum – 1948
- Glemmen Church, Fredrikstad – 1949
- Hamar Cathedral (extensive renovation) – 1954
- Park Hotel, Sandefjord – 1957–60
- Skjerstad Church, Bodø Municipality – 1959
- Høyanger Church, Sogn og Fjordane – 1960
