= Pearse (surname) =

Pearse is a surname. Notable people with the name include:

- Alfred Pearse (1855–1933), English artist, author, campaigner and inventor
- Allan Pearse (1915–1981), English cricketer
- Allie Pearse, Canadian comedian and television writer
- Anne-Maree Pearse, Australian cytogeneticist
- Annette Pearse (1893–1981), New Zealand art gallery curator and director
- Arthur Sperry Pearse (1877–1956), American biologist
- Barbara Pearse (born 1948), British biological scientist
- Benjamin Pearse (1832–1902), Canadian politician
- Brian Pearse (born 1933), British businessman
- Chloe Pearse (born 1994), Irish rugby player
- Col Pearse (born 2003), Australian Paralympic swimmer
- Gary Pearse (born 1953), Australian rugby union international
- George Pearse (disambiguation), several people
- Gracie Pearse (born 2002), English footballer
- Guy Pearse, Australian whistleblower
- Innes Hope Pearse (1889–1978), English medical practitioner and biologist
- Isabel Pearse (1912–1999), American actress
- John Pearse (1939–2008), British guitarist and folk singer
- John Pearse (politician) (1760–1836), English politician
- Lesley Pearse (born 1945), British novelist
- Mabel Cosgrove Wodehouse Pearse (born 1873), Irish writer
- Margaret Pearse (1857–1932), Irish politician
- Margaret Mary Pearse (1878–1968), Irish politician
- Mark Guy Pearse (1842–1930), British writer
- Mike Pearse (born 1965), British cartoonist
- Ormerod Pearse (1884–1953), South African cricketer
- Patrick Pearse (1879–1916), Irish revolutionary
- Ray Pearse (born 1984), Australian lawn bowler
- Richard Pearse (1877–1953), New Zealand aviation pioneer
- Rupert Pearse, British medical researcher
- Samuel Pearse (1897–1919), Recipient of the Victoria Cross
- Samuel Herbert Pearse (1865–1953), Nigerian businessman
- Sarah Pearse (born 1981), English author
- Stephen Pearse, American entrepreneur
- Susan Beatrice Pearse (1878–1980), British illustrator
- Thomas Pearse, British businessman and politician
- Thomas Deane Pearse (1738–1789), British Army officer
- Vyvyan Pearse (1891–1956), South African cricketer and British Army officer
- William Silas Pearse (1838–1908), Australian businessman and politician
- William Silas Pearse (minister) (1869–1949), Australian Congregational minister
- Willie Pearse (1881–1916), Irish revolutionary

== See also ==
- Pearse (disambiguation)
- Pearce (surname)
- Pears (surname)
- Pierce (surname)
- Peirce (surname)
- Pearson (surname)
