= Pearce =

Pearce may refer to:

== Places ==
- Pearce, Australian Capital Territory, a suburb
- Division of Pearce, an electoral division in Western Australia
- Pearce, Arizona, United States, an unincorporated community
- RAAF Base Pearce, the main Royal Australian Air Force air base in Western Australia
- RCAF Station Pearce, a Second World War training base in Alberta, Canada

== People and fictional characters ==
- Pearce (given name)
- Pearce (surname)

== See also ==
- J.J. Pearce High School in Richardson, Texas
- Pearse (disambiguation)
- Pierce (disambiguation)
- Peirce (disambiguation)
