= Piers =

Piers may refer to:

- Pier, a raised structure over a body of water
- Pier (architecture), an architectural support
- Piers (name), a given name and surname (including lists of people with the name)
- Piers baronets, two titles, in the baronetages of Ireland and Nova Scotia
- Piers Island, British Columbia, Canada
- PIERS: The Port Import/Export Reporting Service, an American trade intelligence company

== See also ==
- Pier (disambiguation)
- Pierres (disambiguation)
- Pierse
- Pierce (disambiguation)
- Peirse (disambiguation)
