= Pierce =

Pierce may refer to:

== Places ==
=== Canada ===
- Pierce Range, a mountain range on Vancouver Island, British Columbia

=== United States ===
- Pierce, Colorado
- Pierce, Idaho
- Pierce, Illinois
- Pierce, Kentucky
- Pierce, Nebraska
- Pierce, Texas
- Pierce, West Virginia
- Pierce, Wisconsin
- Mount Pierce (New Hampshire), a peak in the White Mountains
- Pierce County (disambiguation), several places
- Pierce Township (disambiguation)

== Organizations ==
- Pierce Biotechnology, an American biotechnology company focused on protein biology
- Pierce Manufacturing, an American manufacturer of fire trucks
- Franklin Pierce Law Center, a law school in Concord, New Hampshire
- Franklin Pierce University, a liberal arts college in Rindge, New Hampshire

== People ==
- Pierce (given name)
- Pierce (surname)

== Other uses ==
- Pierce-Arrow Motor Car Company
- Pierce Washington, one of the main characters of Saints Row 2 and Saints Row: The Third
- Pierce oscillator, an electronic oscillator
- Pierce's disease, a grape disease
- Pierce Protein Assay, a method of quantification of protein in biology
- Pierce v. Society of Sisters, a 1925 United States Supreme Court case

== Arts and entertainment ==
- Pierce 2024 film, a psychological thriller film by Nelicia Low

== See also ==
- Piercing
- Piers Ploughman
- Peirce (disambiguation)
- Pierse
