= Pearse =

Pearse may refer to:

- Pearse (surname), includes list of people with the name
- Pearse Island, an island on the north coast of British Columbia, Canada
- Pearse Islands, a small archipelago at the northern entrance to Johnstone Strait, near Alert Bay, British Columbia, Canada
  - Pearse Peninsula, Broughton Island
- Pearse Museum, Dublin, Ireland
- Pearse River, Tasman, New Zealand
- Pearse Strait, Nunavut, Canada

== See also ==
- Pearse Park (disambiguation)
- Pearce (disambiguation)
- Peirce (disambiguation)
