= Pierce Protein Assay =

The Pierce Protein Assay is a method of protein quantification. It provides quick estimation of the protein amount in a given sample.

== Protocol ==
The assay is separated into three main parts: preparation of the Diluted Albumin (BSA) Standards, preparation of the bicinchoninic acid (BCA) working reagent, and quantification of proteins (using either test tube or microplate procedure).

== Advantages and disadvantages ==
=== Advantages ===
This method is able to detect as low as 25 μg/ml and up to 2000 μg/ml of protein in a 65 ul sample, using standard protocol. This method may be preferred for samples containing detergents or other reducing agents. This method has a fast detection speed and low protein-to-protein variability in comparison to the BCA or Coomassie (Bradford) Assays. This method has a stable end point.

=== Disadvantages ===
This method has greater protein-to-protein variability than the BCA Assay.
