= Pier (disambiguation) =

A pier is a raised walkway over water, supported by widely spread piles or pillars.

Pier or PIER may also refer to:

== People with the name ==
- Pier (given name)
- Pier (surname)

== Acronym ==
- Pacific Island Ecosystems at Risk (PIER), a sub-website of the 1997–2012 Hawaiian Ecosystems at Risk project (HEAR)
- Percutaneous intentional extraluminal revascularization, a procedure in interventional radiology
- Progress in Electromagnetics Research, a peer-reviewed open access scientific journal
- Policing Institute for the Eastern Region, part of Anglia Ruskin University, England

== Other uses ==
- Pier (architecture), an upright support used in buildings
- Pier (bridge structure) an upright support between two spans of a bridge
- The Pier, a 2011 Irish romantic drama film

== See also ==
- Piers (disambiguation)
- San Pier (disambiguation)
