= Peirse =

Peirse may refer to:

== People with the surname ==
- Henry Peirse (1750s–1824), English politician
- Richard Peirse (Royal Navy officer) (1860–1940), English Royal Navy officer
- Richard Peirse (1892–1970), English RAF commander
- Richard Peirse (RAF officer) (1931–2014), English RAF officer
- Sarah Peirse, New Zealand actress

== People with the double-barrelled name ==
- Beresford-Peirse baronets
- Noel Beresford-Peirse (1887–1953), British Army officer

== See also ==
- Peirce (disambiguation)
- Pierse
- Piers (disambiguation)
- Pierce (disambiguation)
