= Wilton, Illinois =

Wilton
- Unincorporated community
- Location of Wilton within Illinois Wilton (the United States)
- Coordinates: 41°22′46″N 87°56′03″W
- Country: United States
- State: Illinois
- County: Will
- Township: Wilton
- Elevation: 692 ft (211 m)
- Time zone: UTC-6 (CST)
  - Summer (DST): UTC-5 (CDT)

Wilton is located northeast of Wilton Center, Illinois, northwest of Andres and south of Frankfort.

Wilton is the smallest Unincorporated community in Will County. It is smaller than Andres with a population of approximately 20 people, and at one point was simply a rail depot for the now-removed Illinois, Iowa, and Minnesota line.
