= San Pier =

San Pier may refer to:

- San Pier Niceto, municipality in the Province of Messina in the Italian region Sicily, Italy
- San Pier d'Isonzo, town and comune in the province of Gorizia, northern Italy

== See also ==
- San Pier Maggiore (disambiguation)
- San Pietro (disambiguation)
- Pier (disambiguation)
