= Boothite =

Rare, naturally occurring mineral

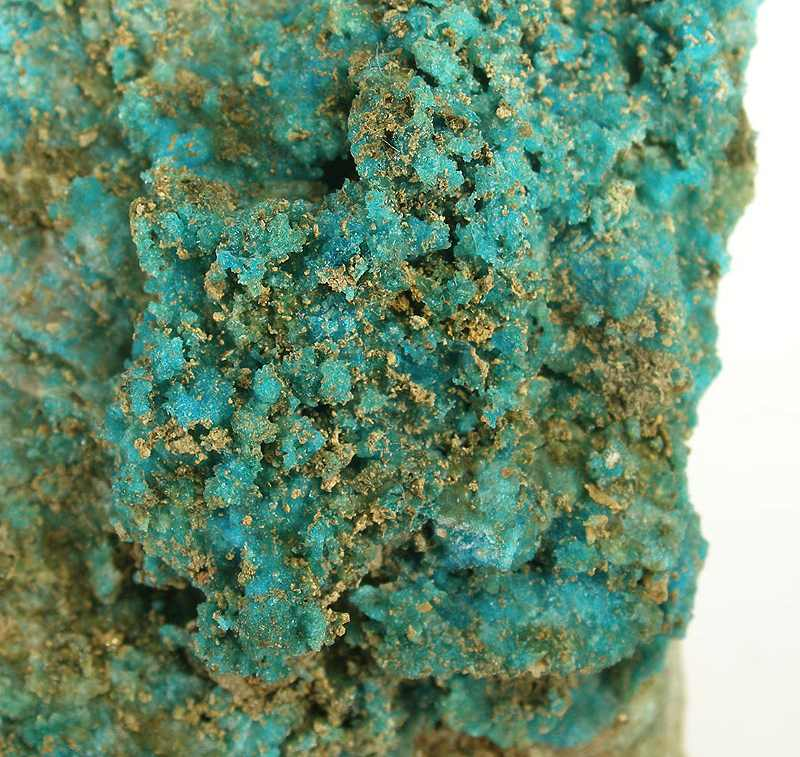
- Boothite with Arseniosiderite

General
- Category: Copper sulphate
- Group: Melanterite Group
- Formula: Cu(SO_{4})·7H_{2}O
- IMA status: Approved
- Strunz classification: 7.CB.35
- Crystal system: Monoclinic

Identification
- Color: Light blue
- Mohs scale hardness: 2 - 2.5
- Luster: Vitreous, Silky, Pearly
- Specific gravity: 1.94

Boothite is a very rare, naturally occurring mineral composed of the heptahydrate of copper sulfate: Cu(SO_{4})·7H_{2}O. It was discovered in the Leona Heights region near Oakland, California before 1959. It is named for Edward Booth, a chemist at the University of California, who directed Waldemar Schaller, who described the mineral.
