= Peirce =

Peirce may refer to:

- Charles Sanders Peirce (1839–1914), American philosopher, founder of pragmatism
- Ted Peirce (1933–2026), Australian water polo player

== Schools ==
- Peirce College, Philadelphia, formerly known as Peirce College of Business, Peirce Junior College and Peirce School of Business Administration
- Peirce School (also known as Old Peirce School), West Newton, Massachusetts
- Helen C. Peirce School of International Studies, an elementary school in Chicago

== Others ==
- Peirce (crater), a lunar crater
- Peirce (given name), including a list of people with the given name
- Peirce (surname), including a list of people with the surname

== See also ==
- Pierce (disambiguation)
- Peirse (disambiguation)
