= Derek Wanless =

English banker and an adviser to the Labour Party

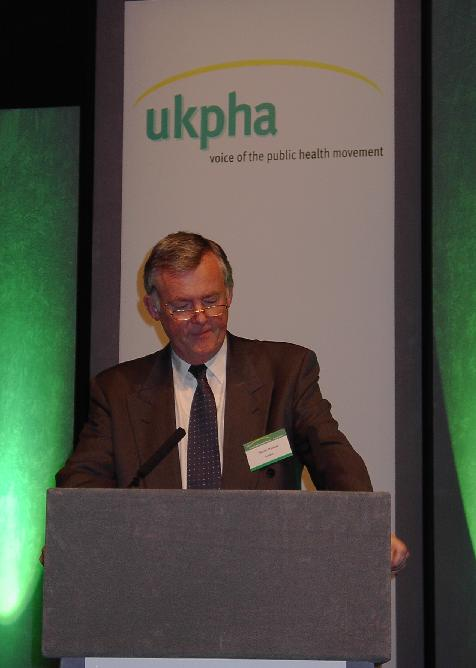
- Wanless at UK Public Health Conference 2003
- Born: 29 September 1947; Newcastle upon Tyne, England
- Died: 22 May 2012 (aged 64)
- Occupations: Banker and adviser to the Labour Party
- Known for: Non-Executive Director of Northern Rock

Sir Derek Wanless (29 September 1947 – 22 May 2012) was an English banker and an adviser to the Labour Party on health and social care policy.

== Biography ==
Derek Wanless was born in Newcastle upon Tyne, where he was educated at the Royal Grammar School. From 1967 to 1970, he was an undergraduate, studying mathematics at King's College, Cambridge, which he attended on a support grant from Westminster Bank, graduating as Senior Wrangler in 1970. He subsequently moved into banking, qualifying as a statistician and attending the Program for Management Development at Harvard. He was a member of the Institute of Statisticians and a Fellow of the Chartered Institute of Bankers, of which he was president in 1999.

He had joined Westminster Bank, a constituent of the present National Westminster Bank in 1967, beginning with a Saturday job, before becoming NatWest's director of personal banking from 1986 to 1988. He then became the general manager for UK Branch Business and UK Financial Services and in 1992 took on the role of group chief executive until 1999, when he received a reported pay-off of £3,000,000. On 8 October 1999, BBC News reported that Derek Wanless had been ousted from his position as chief executive. Wanless was reportedly forced out by the bank's non-executive directors, who replaced him with Sir David Rowland. Wanless had been criticized by City investors for taking the bank into investment banking and failing to curtail high costs. As executive responsible for NatWest's card business, he led the team which invented Switch, the UK's debit card scheme. He led the NatWest Group immediately prior to its takeover, by the (then) relatively small Royal Bank of Scotland.

In 2002, he carried out a landmark review of the future funding of the National Health Service for Gordon Brown, then Chancellor of the Exchequer. His report, Securing Our Future Health: Taking a Long-Term View, was the first serious government attempt to independently assess the NHS's long-term funding needs and influenced major increases in NHS spending and taxation. In 2007, he carried out a follow-up review for the King's Fund.

He was a non-executive director of Northern Rock from 2000 to 2007, where he was chairman of the bank's Audit and Risk committees. His position became highly contentious following the incipient collapse of Northern Rock in September 2007. The Northern Rock's crisis was due to inadequate risk provision, and a 'run on the Bank' was only halted with promises of unlimited UK government support.

Sir Derek was heavily criticised regarding his role in the Northern Rock affair by a committee of MPs sitting on the Commons Treasury Select Committee on 16 October 2007. Sir Derek's resignation was accepted by Northern Rock's newly appointed chairman on 17 November 2007. He died of pancreatic cancer at the age of 64 in 2012.

== Affiliations ==
Sir Derek Wanless was a Freeman of the City of London, received a Knighthood in the 2005 New Year Honours and a Doctor of Civil Law, honoris causa from Durham University on 30 June 2005. He received an Honorary Doctorate in Business Administration (Hon DBA) from Sunderland University in July 2007. A further Honorary Doctorate was awarded by Coventry University in November 2007, which prompted a Daily Telegraph article questioning the value of such awards.

The House of Commons Select Treasury Committee published its report into the Northern Rock affair on 24 January 2008. Wanless's role as chairman of the Risk Committee, was criticized in the report. The report's conclusion is appended below, and the full report may be found as referenced.

#31. - The directors of Northern Rock were the principal authors of the difficulties that the company has faced since August 2007. It is right that members of the Board of Northern Rock have been replaced, though haphazardly, since the company became dependent on liquidity support from the Bank of England. The high-risk, reckless business strategy of Northern Rock, with its reliance on short- and medium-term wholesale funding and an absence of sufficient insurance and a failure to arrange standby facility or cover that risk, meant that it was unable to cope with the liquidity pressures placed upon it by the freezing of international capital markets in August 2007. Given that the formulation of that strategy was a fundamental role of the Board of Northern Rock, overseen by some directors who had been there since its demutualisation, the failure of that strategy must also be attributed to the Board. The non-executive members of the Board, and in particular the Chairman of the Board, the Chairman of the Risk Committee and the senior non-executive director, failed in the case of Northern Rock to ensure that it remained liquid as well as solvent, to provide against the risks that it was taking and to act as an effective restraining force on the strategy of the executive members.

== Key publications ==
- 2007: Our Future Health Secured? A review of NHS funding and performance for the King's Fund
- 2006: Securing Good Health for Older People for the King's Fund with the Personal Social Services Research Unit (PSSRU) at The London School of Economics.
- 2004: Securing Good Health for the Whole Population for HM Treasury
- 2002: Securing Our Future Health: Taking a Long-Term View for HM Treasury

== See also ==
- Sir Brian Pearse, chief executive from 1991 to 1994 of Midland Bank
