= Roy Oliver =

Roy Oliver may refer to:

- The police officer convicted in the murder of Jordan Edwards
- The second and long-time CEO of Pierce Biotechnology

== See also ==
- Olivier Roy (disambiguation)
