= Pierce, Illinois =

Unincorporated community in Will County, Illinois

Coordinates: 41°18′01″N 87°54′55″W

Pierce was a small unincorporated area in Will County, located in Wilton Township. Pierce was around two miles south of Wilton Center and was about six miles southwest of Peotone. The area was abandoned and is now home to a farm and houses.

== Geography and history ==
Pierce has the South Branch of Forked Creek flowing through which was one of the main sources of water when Pierce was still around. There was a post office there for a short time in 1856, by Huyck's Grove.
