= Oliver H. Lowry =

American biochemist

Oliver Howe Lowry
- Born: 18 July 1910; Chicago, Illinois, US
- Died: 28 June 1996 (aged 85); St. Louis, Missouri, US
- Education: Northwestern University; University of Chicago
- Known for: Lowry protein assay Silent Subliminal presentation system
- Spouse(s): Norma Van Ness Lowry, Adrienne Clark Kennedy Lowry
- Children: 5
- Awards: American Academy of Arts and Sciences (1957): Midwest Award, American Chemical Society (1962); Merit Award of Northwestern University (1963); John Scott Award (1963); National Academy of Sciences (1964); Borden Award, Association of American Medical Colleges (1966)
- Scientific career
- Fields: Biochemistry
- Workplaces: Washington University in St. Louis
- Thesis: A micro method for blood acetone bodies involving only one distillation and its application in studies on rats (1937)
- Doctoral advisor: Fred Conrad Koch

Oliver Howe Lowry (July 18, 1910 – June 29, 1996) was an American biochemist. He devised the Lowry protein assay, the subject of the most-cited scientific paper in history.

== Biography ==
Lowry was the youngest of a family of five children. His father was a teacher and later an administrator in the Chicago public school system. His three brothers and sister all earned graduate degrees in various fields, and Lowry was inspired to emulate his siblings. He attended Northwestern University in Evanston, Illinois, for his undergraduate studies, having intended to major in chemical engineering. However, upon the advice of a fellow student, he ended up shifting his focus towards biochemistry. After graduating from Northwestern in 1932, he enrolled at the University of Chicago, where he sought to study "physiological chemistry". During his second year, a dean of the university offered Lowry admission to the university's MD-PhD program, which he accepted and from which he graduated in 1937. Despite that he earned a medical degree, Lowry never practiced medicine.

After graduating from the University of Chicago with his two doctoral degrees, Lowry failed in his attempt to secure a postdoctoral fellowship. He left Chicago to work at Harvard University under A. Baird Hastings. During Lowry's time at Harvard, Hastings was able to arrange for Lowry to work for five months at the Carlsberg Laboratory in Copenhagen, Denmark, where he worked with Kaj Ulrik Linderstrøm-Lang. By 1942, Otto Bessey persuaded his friend Lowry to join him at the newly established Public Health Research Institute in New York City, where Lowry would work until 1947.

In 1947, Washington University in St. Louis invited Lowry to head its Department of Pharmacology despite the fact that Lowry had never taken a course in pharmacology and his research was only tangentially related to that field. Nevertheless, Lowry served as the department head for the next twenty-nine years. He also served as dean of the Washington University School of Medicine from 1955 to 1958. He was eventually succeeded as department head by Philip Needleman, but Lowry continued to work at Washington University for many years after becoming a Distinguished Professor Emeritus of Molecular Biology and Pharmacology. Lowry was elected to the American Academy of Arts and Sciences in 1957 and to the National Academy of Sciences in 1964. He died of Alzheimer's disease, at the age of 85, on June 29, 1996.

== Scientific impact ==
Among all his numerous contributions to biochemistry, Lowry is best known for his development of the Lowry protein assay, used in the determination of protein concentrations. As of October 2025, his 1951 paper in the Journal of Biological Chemistry describing the protein assay was still the most-highly cited paper in history, with more than 355,000 citations, although Lowry stated it was not the most important paper he had ever written.
