= Bicinchoninic acid assay =

Method to determine protein concentration

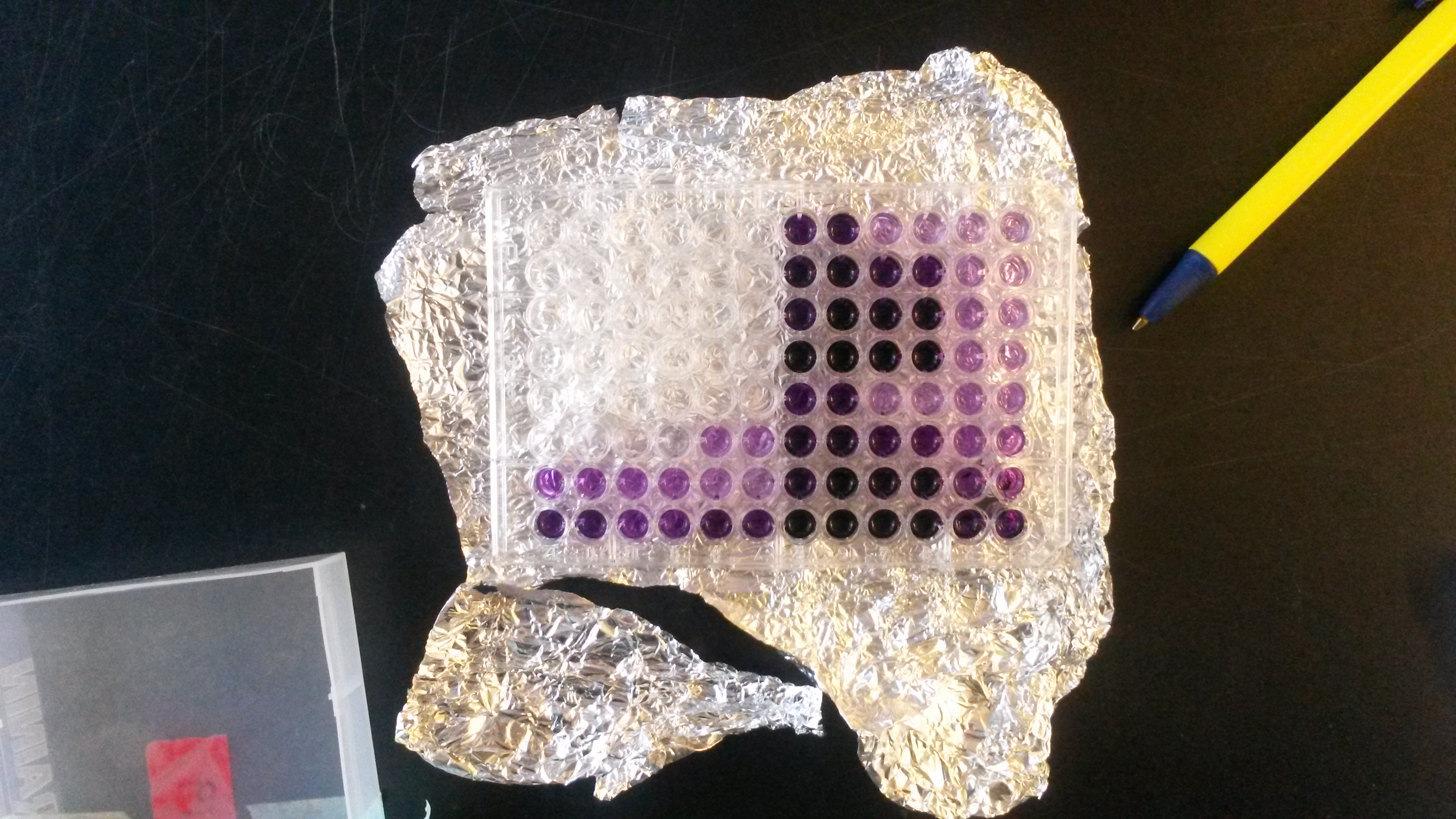
BCA protein assay in a 96 well plate

The bicinchoninic acid assay (BCA assay), also known as the Smith assay, after its inventor, Paul K. Smith at the Pierce Chemical Company, is a biochemical assay for determining the total concentration of protein in a solution (0.5 μg/mL to 1.5 mg/mL), similar to Lowry protein assay, Bradford protein assay or biuret reagent. The total protein concentration is exhibited by a color change of the sample solution from blue to purple in proportion to protein concentration, which can then be measured using colorimetric techniques. The BCA assay was patented by Pierce Chemical Company in 1989 & the patent expired in 2006.

== Mechanism ==
A stock BCA solution contains the following ingredients in a highly alkaline solution with a pH 11.25: bicinchoninic acid, sodium carbonate, sodium bicarbonate, sodium tartrate, and copper(II) sulfate pentahydrate.

The BCA assay primarily relies on two reactions. First, the peptide bonds in protein reduce Cu^{2+} ions from the copper(II) sulfate to Cu^{1+} (a temperature dependent reaction). The amount of Cu^{2+} reduced is proportional to the amount of protein present in the solution. Next, two molecules of bicinchoninic acid chelate with each Cu^{1+} ion, forming a purple-colored complex that strongly absorbs light at a wavelength of 562 nm.

The bicinchoninic acid Cu^{1+} complex is influenced in protein samples by the presence of cysteine/cystine, tyrosine, and tryptophan side chains. At higher temperatures (37 to 60 °C), peptide bonds assist in the formation of the reaction complex. Incubating the BCA assay at higher temperatures is recommended as a way to increase assay sensitivity while minimizing the variances caused by unequal amino acid composition.

The amount of protein present in a solution can be quantified by measuring the absorption spectra and comparing with protein solutions of known concentration.

== Limitations ==
The BCA assay is largely incompatible with reducing agents and metal chelators, although trace quantities may be tolerated. The BCA assay also reportedly responds to common membrane lipids and phospholipids.

== Assay variants ==
There are a few alternative variants of the BCA assay:

=== Original BCA assay ===
As described by Smith, the original BCA assay is a two-component protocol. The two reagents are "stable indefinitely at room temperature". Modern (likely exact or highly similar) formulations are available from at least two commercial vendors. The BCA Working solution is generated by mixing Reagent A and Reagent B in a 50:1 ratio, and can be prepared either weekly (it is moderately stable), or as needed.

Reagent A

- 1% w/v BCA-Na_{2} (CAS: 979-88-4)
- 2% w/v Na_{2}CO_{3}·H_{2}O (CAS: 5968-11-6)
- 0.16% w/v Na_{2} tartrate (CAS: 868-18-8)
- 0.4% w/v NaOH (CAS: 1310-73-2)
- 0.95% w/v NaHCO_{3} (CAS: 144-55-8)
- Add 50% NaOH or solid NaHCO_{3} to adjust the pH to 11.25

A suggested but untested alternative formulation in the Smith manuscript is to leave out the NaOH (and presumably not perform the manual pH adjustment to 11.25), but instead to dissolve the other components in a preprepared buffer of 0.25 M Na_{2}CO_{3} and 0.01 M NaHCO_{3}.

Notably, Smith synthesized their own BCA via the Pfitzinger reaction of isatin and acetoin, substituting NaOH for KOH but otherwise following the synthetic method of Lesene and Henze, as the BCA available from commercial vendors of that time was too impure for their use. At least three successive recrystallizations of their synthesized BCA from 70˚C water was needed to sufficiently purify it for the assay.

Reagent B

- 4% w/v CuSO_{4}·5H_{2}O

=== Micro BCA assay (for dilute solutions) ===
The BCA Micro BCA assay is a 3-component protocol which uses concentrated stocks of the Biuret reaction, BCA, and copper(II) reagents. It allows for an improved sensitivity of ~2 - 40 μg/mL vs 20 - 2000 μg/mL of the original BCA assay. However, it has a different, and generally speaking more sensitive, interference from non-protein components. Kits for the Micro BCA assay are available from at least two commercial vendors. Notably, the composition and use of a "Micro BCA Reagent and Protocol" was described in the original manuscript by Smith, and modern kits likely consist of an exact or highly similar formulation. The protocol consists of mixing Micro-Reagent B and the Copper Solution 25:1 to form Micro-Reagent C (MC), which is not shelf stable and should be freshly prepared, and then mixing MC 1:1 with Micro-Reagent A to produce the final (also unstable) assay working solution. Micro-Reagent A, Micro-Reagent B, and Copper Solution are stable indefinitely at room temperature.

Micro-Reagent A (MA)

- 8% w/v Na_{2}CO_{3}·H_{2}O (CAS: 5968-11-6)
- 1.6% w/v NaOH (CAS: 1310-73-2)
- 1.6% w/v Na_{2} tartrate (CAS: 868-18-8) (10x concentration as Reagent A in Original BCA Assay above)
- Sufficient NaHCO_{3} (CAS: 144-55-8) to adjust pH to 11.25

Micro-Reagent B (MB)

- 4% w/v BCA-Na_{2} (CAS: 979-88-4) (4x concentration as Reagent A in Original BCA Assay above)

Copper Solution

- 4% w/v CuSO_{4}·5H_{2}O (CAS: 7758-99-8) (Same concentration as Reagent B in Original BCA Assay above)

=== Reducing agent compatible (RAC) BSA assay ===
This type of BCA assay includes a proprietary thiol covalent blocking "Compatibility Reagent" a.k.a. a Reducing Agent Compatibility Agent (RACA). Although this allows greater compatibility with reducing agents, the assay has a different interference profile from other non-protein components.

=== Rapid Gold BCA ===
This type of BCA assay seems to only be available from Thermo Fisher Scientific. Reportedly it uses "the same copper reduction method as the traditional BCA Protein Assay with a unique [proprietary] copper chelator.", that absorbs at 480 nm instead of 562 nm. This proprietor chelator and presumed optimized Biuret reaction formulation allows the assay to provide rapid (<5 min) results without the 37˚C+ incubation of the original BCA assay. However, the assay has a different interference profile from other non-protein components. The Pierce Quantitative Colorimetric Peptide Assay (now owned by and available from Thermo Fisher Scientific) appears to use a similar or identical 480 nm absorbing proprietary copper chelator.

== See also ==
- Biuret test
- Bradford assay
- Colloidal gold protein assay
