= Bradford protein assay =

Method to determine protein concentration

The Bradford protein assay (also known as the Coomassie protein assay) was developed by Marion M. Bradford in 1976. It is a quick and accurate spectroscopic analytical procedure used to measure the concentration of protein in a solution. The reaction is dependent on the amino acid composition of the measured proteins.

The original paper presenting and revealing the Bradford protein assay is one of the most cited academic papers in history, currently ranking 3rd on the all-time citation list with just over 150,000 citations.

== Principle ==
Figure 1. Coomassie brilliant blue G-250, the binding dye for the Bradford Method

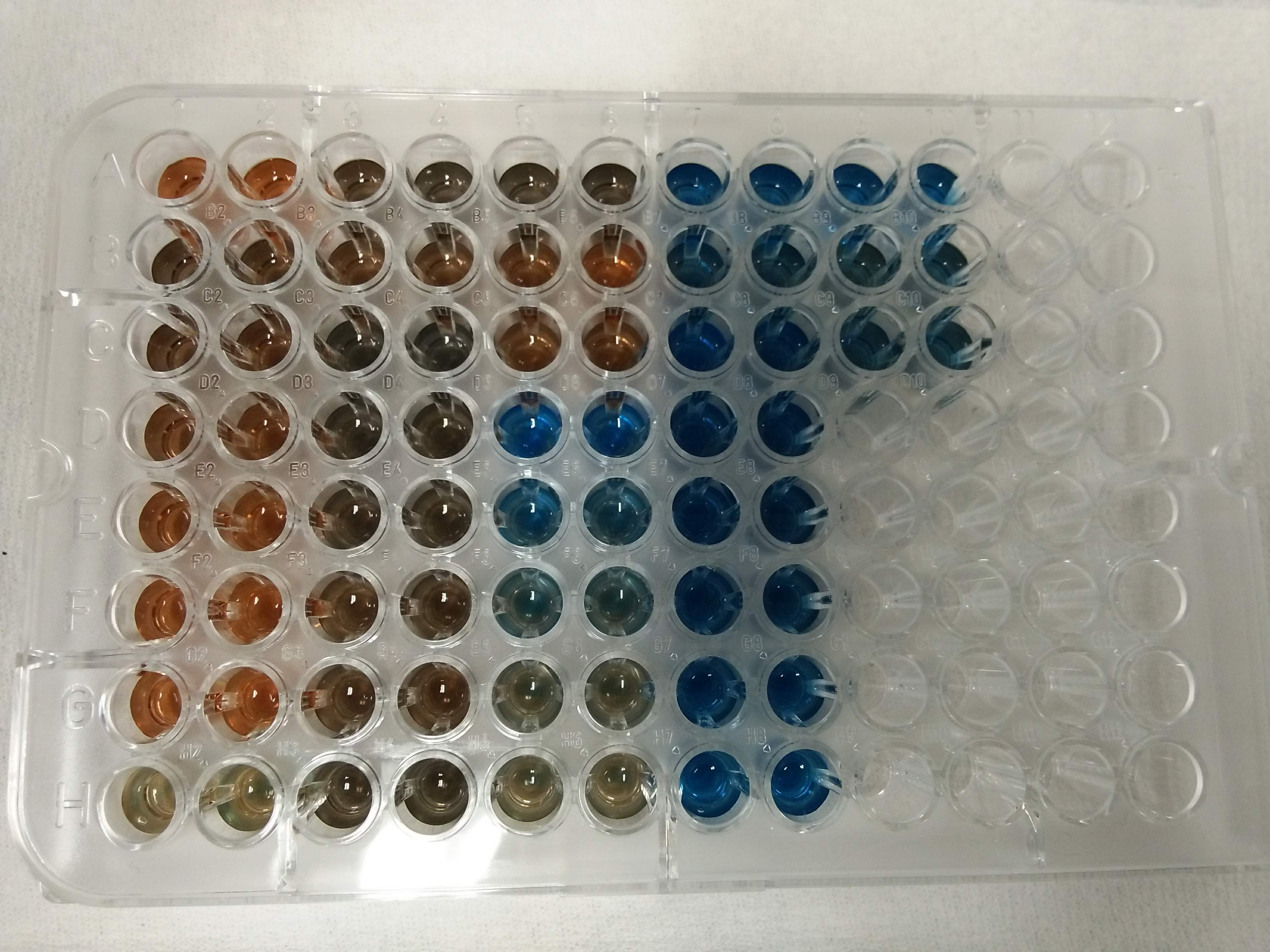
Color reaction of protein and Bradford reagent

The Bradford assay, a colorimetric protein assay, is based on an absorbance shift of the dye Coomassie brilliant blue G-250. The Coomassie brilliant blue G-250 dye exists in three forms: anionic (blue), neutral (green), and cationic (red). Under acidic conditions, the dye is red; when it is deprotonated, the red form of the dye is converted into its blue form, which can bind to the protein being assayed. If there is no protein present, then the solution will remain brown. Dye-protein interactions are driven by electrostatic interactions between positively charged arginine (and to a lesser extent, lysine and histidine) and the deprotonated negatively charged sulfonate groups on the dye, as well as hydrophobic interactions with the aromatic amino acids (tryptophan, tyrosine, phenylalanine). Binding of the dye to the protein stabilizes the anionic form of the dye, which can be detected colorimetrically by a shift from 465 nm to 595 nm. The cationic (unbound) form is red and has an absorption spectrum maximum at 465 nm, whereas the anionic bound form has an absorption spectrum maximum at 595 nm. The increase of absorbance at 595 nm is proportional to the amount of bound dye, and thus to the amount (concentration) of protein present in the sample.

Unlike other protein assays, the Bradford protein assay is less susceptible to interference by various chemical compounds such as sodium, potassium or even carbohydrates like sucrose, that may be present in protein samples. An exception of note is elevated concentrations of detergent. Sodium dodecyl sulfate (SDS), a common detergent, may be found in protein extracts because it is used to lyse cells by disrupting the membrane lipid bilayer and to denature proteins for SDS-PAGE. While other detergents interfere with the assay at high concentration, the interference caused by SDS is of two different modes, and each occurs at a different concentration. When SDS concentrations are below critical micelle concentration (known as CMC, 0.00333%W/V to 0.0667%) in a Coomassie dye solution, the detergent tends to bind strongly with the protein, inhibiting the protein binding sites for the dye reagent. This can cause underestimations of protein concentration in solution. When SDS concentrations are above CMC, the detergent associates strongly with the green form of the Coomassie dye, causing the equilibrium to shift, thereby producing more of the blue form. This causes an increase in the absorbance at 595 nm independent of protein presence.

Other interference may come from the buffer used when preparing the protein sample. A high concentration of buffer will cause an overestimated protein concentration due to depletion of free protons from the solution by conjugate base from the buffer. This will not be a problem if a low concentration of protein (subsequently the buffer) is used.

In order to measure the absorbance of a colorless compound a Bradford assay must be performed. Some colorless compounds such as proteins can be quantified at an Optical Density of 280 nm due to the presence of aromatic rings such as tryptophan, tyrosine and phenylalanine but if none of these amino acids are present then the absorption cannot be measured at 280 nm.

== Advantages ==
Many protein-containing solutions have the highest absorption at 280 nm in the spectrophotometer, the UV range. This requires spectrophotometers capable of measuring in the UV range, which many cannot. Additionally, the absorption maxima at 280 nm requires that proteins contain aromatic amino acids such as tyrosine (Y), phenylalanine (F) and/or tryptophan (W). Not all proteins contain these amino acids, a fact which will skew the concentration measurements. If nucleic acids are present in the sample, they would also absorb light at 280 nm, skewing the results further. By using the Bradford protein assay, one can avoid all of these complications by simply mixing the protein samples with the Coomassie brilliant blue G-250 dye (Bradford reagent) and measuring their absorbances at 595 nm, which is in the visible range and may be accurately measured by the use of a mobile smartphone camera.

The procedure for Bradford protein assay is very easy and simple to follow. It is done in one step where the Bradford reagent is added to a test tube along with the sample. After mixing well, the mixture almost immediately changes to a blue color. When the dye binds to the proteins through a process that takes about 2 minutes, a change in the absorption maximum of the dye from 465 nm to 595 nm in acidic solutions occurs. Additionally, protein binding triggers a metachromatic reaction, evidenced by the emergence of a species that absorbs light around 595 nm, indicative of the unprotonated form This dye creates strong noncovalent bonds with the proteins, via electrostatic interactions with the amino and carboxyl groups, as well as Van Der Waals interactions. Only the molecules that bind to the proteins in solution exhibit this change in absorption, which eliminates the concern that unbound molecules of the dye might contribute to the experimentally obtained absorption reading. This process is more beneficial since it is less pricey than other methods, easy to use, and has high sensitivity of the dye for protein.

After 5 minutes of incubation, the absorbance can be read at 595 nm using a spectrophotometer or a mobile smartphone camera (RGBradford method).

This assay is one of the fastest assays performed on proteins. The total time it takes to set up and complete the assay is under 30 minutes. The entire experiment is done at room temperature.

The Bradford protein assay can measure protein quantities as little as 1 to 20 μg. It is an extremely sensitive technique.

The dye reagent is a stable ready to use product prepared in phosphoric acid. It can remain at room temperature for up to 2 weeks before it starts to degrade.

Protein samples usually contain salts, solvents, buffers, preservatives, reducing agents and metal chelating agents. These molecules are frequently used for solubilizing and stabilizing proteins. Other protein assay like BCA and Lowry are ineffective because molecules like reducing agents interfere with the assay. Using Bradford can be advantageous against these molecules because they are compatible to each other and will not interfere.

The linear graph acquired from the assay (absorbance versus protein concentration in μg/mL) can be easily extrapolated to determine the concentration of proteins by using the slope of the line.

It is a sensitive technique. It is also very simple: measuring the OD at 595 nm after 5 minutes of incubation. This method can also make use of a Vis spectrophotometer or a mobile smartphone camera (RGBradford method).

== Disadvantages ==
The Bradford assay is linear over a short range, typically from 0 μg/mL to 2000 μg/mL, often making dilutions of a sample necessary before analysis. In making these dilutions, error in one dilution is compounded in further dilutions resulting in a linear relationship that may not always be accurate.

Basic conditions and detergents, such as SDS, can interfere with the dye's ability to bind to the protein through its side chains.

The reagents in this method tend to stain the test tubes. Same test tubes cannot be used since the stain would affect the absorbance reading. This method is also time sensitive. When more than one solution is tested, it is important to make sure every sample is incubated for the same amount of time for accurate comparison.

A limiting factor in using Coomassie-based protein determination dyes stems from the significant variation in color yield observed across different proteins This limiting factor is notably evident in collagen-rich protein samples, like pancreatic extracts, where both the Lowry and Bradford methods tend to underestimate protein content.

It is also inhibited by the presence of detergents, although this problem can be alleviated by the addition of cyclodextrins to the assay mixture.

Much of the non-linearity stems from the equilibrium between two different forms of the dye which is perturbed by adding the protein. The Bradford assay linearizes by measuring the ratio of the absorbances, 595 over 450 nm. This modified Bradford assay is approximately 10 times more sensitive than the conventional one.

The Coomassie Blue G250 dye used to bind to the proteins in the original Bradford method readily binds to arginine and lysine groups of proteins. This is a disadvantage because the preference of the dye to bind to these amino acids can result in a varied response of the assay between different proteins. Changes to the original method, such as increasing the pH by adding NaOH or adding more dye have been made to correct this variation. Although these modifications result in a less sensitive assay, a modified method becomes sensitive to detergents that can interfere with sample.

== Future of Bradford Protein Assay ==
New modifications for an improved Bradford Protein Assay have been underway that specifically focuses on enhancing detection accuracy for collagen proteins. One notable modification involves incorporating small amounts, approximately .0035%, of sodium dodecyl sulfate (SDS). This inclusion of SDS has been shown to result in a fourfold increase in color response for three key collagen proteins—Collagen types I, III, and IV—while simultaneously decreasing the absorbance of non-collagen proteins, to bring the response curve closer between non-collagen protein and collagen protein.

This simple modification in the preparation of the reagent resulted in Bradford Assays to produce similar response curves for both collagen and non-collagen proteins, expanding the use of Bradford Assays in samples containing high collagen proteins.

== Sample Bradford procedure ==
=== Materials ===
- Lyophilized bovine plasma gamma globulin
- Coomassie brilliant blue 1
- 0.15 M NaCl
- Spectrophotometer and cuvettes or a mobile smartphone camera (RGBradford method).
- Micropipettes

=== Procedure (Standard Assay, 20-150 μg protein; 200-1500 μg/mL) ===
1. Prepare a series of standards diluted with 0.15 M NaCl to final concentrations of 0 (blank = No protein), 250, 500, 750 and 1500 μg/mL. Also prepare serial dilutions of the unknown sample to be measured.
2. Add 100 μL of each of the above to a separate test tube (or spectrophotometer tube if using a Spectronic 20).
3. Add 5.0 mL of Coomassie Blue to each tube and mix by vortex, or inversion.
4. Adjust the spectrophotometer to a wavelength of 595 nm, using the tube which contains no protein (blank).
5. Wait 5 minutes and read each of the standards and each of the samples at 595 nm wavelength.
6. Plot the absorbance of the standards vs. their concentration. Compute the extinction coefficient and calculate the concentrations of the unknown samples.

=== Procedure (Micro Assay, 1-10 μg protein/mL) ===
1. Prepare standard concentrations of protein of 1, 5, 7.5 and 10 μg/mL. Prepare a blank of NaCl only. Prepare a series of sample dilutions.
2. Add 100 μL of each of the above to separate tubes (use microcentrifuge tubes) and add 1.0 mL of Coomassie Blue to each tube.
3. Turn on and adjust a spectrophotometer to a wavelength of 595 nm, and blank the spectrophotometer using 1.5 mL cuvettes or use a mobile smartphone camera (RGBradford method).
4. Wait 2 minutes and read the absorbance of each standard and sample at 595 nm.
5. Plot the absorbance of the standards vs. their concentration. Compute the extinction coefficient and calculate the concentrations of the unknown samples.

== Using data obtained to find concentration of unknown ==
In summary, in order to find a standard curve, one must use varying concentrations of BSA (Bovine Serum Albumin) in order to create a standard curve with concentration plotted on the x-axis and absorbance plotted on the y-axis. Only a narrow concentration of BSA is used (2-10 ug/mL) in order to create an accurate standard curve. Using a broad range of protein concentration will make it harder to determine the concentration of the unknown protein. This standard curve is then used to determine the concentration of the unknown protein. The following elaborates on how one goes from the standard curve to the concentration of the unknown.

First, add a line of best fit, or Linear regression and display the equation on the chart. Ideally, the R^{2} value will be as close to 1 as possible. R represents the sum of the square values of the fit subtracted from each data point. Therefore, if R^{2} is much less than one, consider redoing the experiment to get one with more reliable data.

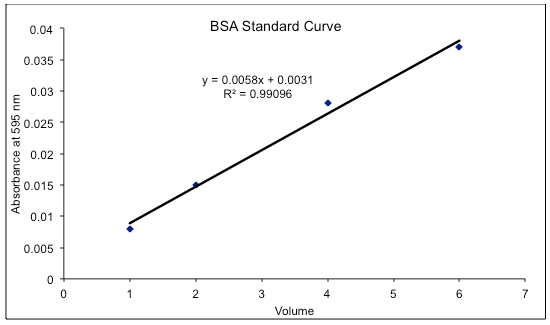
Graph 1. Actual BSA data attained from a micro scale UV-Vis Spectrophotometer

The equation displayed on the chart gives a means for calculating the absorbance and therefore concentration of the unknown samples. In Graph 1, x is concentration and y is absorbance, so one must rearrange the equation to solve for x and enter the absorbance of the measured unknown. It is likely that the unknown will have absorbance numbers outside the range of the standard. These should not be included calculations, as the equation given cannot apply to numbers outside of its limitations. In a large scale, one must compute the extinction coefficient using the Beer-Lambert Law A=εLC in which A is the measured absorbance, ε is the slope of the standard curve, L is the length of the cuvette, and C is the concentration being determined. In a micro scale, a cuvette may not be used and therefore one only has to rearrange to solve for x.

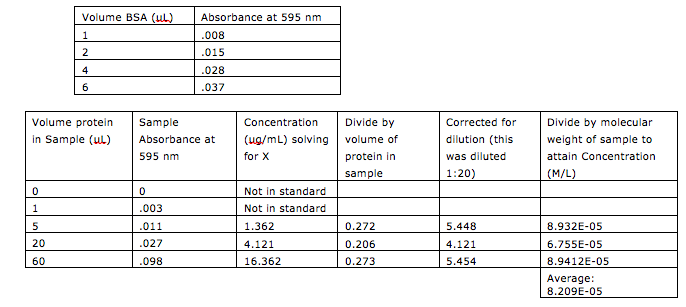
Table 1. Actual assay data for determine concentration of unknown based on line of best fit of the above standard curve

In order to attain a concentration that makes sense with the data, the dilutions, concentrations, and units of the unknown must be normalized (Table 1). To do this, one must divide concentration by volume of protein in order to normalize concentration and multiply by amount diluted to correct for any dilution made in the protein before performing the assay.

== Alternative assays ==
Alternative protein assays include:

- Ultraviolet–visible spectroscopy
- RGBradford
- Biuret protein assay
- Lowry protein assay
- BCA protein assay
- Amido black protein assay
- Colloidal gold protein assay
