= Piercetown =

Piercetown may refer to the following places in Ireland:

- Piercetown, County Wexford, a village in County Wexford
- Piercetown, County Westmeath (civil parish), a civil parish in County Westmeath
- Piercetown, County Westmeath (townland), a townland in the civil parish of Castlelost, County Westmeath

== See also ==
- Pierce Township (disambiguation)
