= Pearce (given name) =

Pearce is a given name. Notable people with the name include:

- Pearce Bailey (1865–1922), American neurologist and psychiatrist,
- Pearce Chiles (1867–1933), American baseball player
- Pearce Paul Creasman (born 1981), archaeologist
- Pearce Hanley (born 1988), Australian rules footballer
- Pearce Johnson, sports editor and American football executive
- Pearce Lane (1930–2018), American boxer
- Pearce Quigley, English actor
- Pearce Young (1918–1984), American politician
- Pearce Wright (1933–2005), British science journalist

== See also ==
- Peirce (given name)
- Pierce (given name)
- Pearce (surname)
