= Marion M. Bradford =

American scientist (1946–2021)

- Born: October 28, 1946; Rome, Georgia
- Died: May 3, 2021 (aged 74); Hendersonville, North Carolina
- Education: University of Georgia
- Known for: Bradford assay
- Scientific career
- Fields: Biochemistry
- Thesis: Enzymology of penetration of the mammalian ovum (1975)
- Doctoral advisor: William L. Williams

Marion Mckinley Bradford (October 28, 1946 - May 3, 2021) was an American scientist who developed and patented the Bradford protein assay, a method to quickly quantify the amount of protein in a sample. His paper describing the method is among the most cited scholarly articles of all time.

== Biography ==
=== Early life and education ===
Bradford was born October 28, 1946, in Rome, Georgia, US, and received his B.A. from Shorter College there in 1967. In 1971 he married Janet Holliday. He obtained his Ph.D. in biochemistry from the University of Georgia in 1975, and his use of the Coomassie Brilliant Blue G-250 dye to detect proteins, which became known as the Bradford assay, was patented in 1976.

=== Career ===
Bradford was employed by the University of Georgia as a research biochemist from 1977 to 1983. In the latter year he joined A. E. Staley and worked in biochemical research there until his retirement.

Bradford died on May 3, 2021, in Hendersonville, North Carolina.

== Award ==
- 2019 - University of Georgia Distinction Award
