= Olivier Roy =

Olivier Roy may refer to:

- Olivier Roy (ice hockey) (born 1991), Canadian ice hockey goaltender
- Olivier Roy (political scientist) (born 1949), professor at the European University Institute in Florence

== See also ==
- Roy Oliver (disambiguation)
- Olivier Rey – French mathematician and philosopher
