= Wilton Township, Illinois =

Coordinates: 41°20′17″N 87°57′39″W

Wilton Township
- Township
- Location in Will County
- Country: United States
- State: Illinois
- County: Will
- Established: November 6, 1849

Area
  - Total: 36.34 sq mi (94.1 km^{2})
  - Land: 36.34 sq mi (94.1 km^{2})
  - Water: 0 sq mi (0 km^{2}) 0%
- Elevation: 300 ft (91 m)

Population (2010)
  - Estimate (2016): 828
  - Density: 23.1/sq mi (8.9/km^{2})
- Time zone: UTC-6 (CST)
  - Summer (DST): UTC-5 (CDT)
- FIPS code: 17-197-82244
- Website: www.wiltontownship.org/

Wilton Township is located in Will County, Illinois. As of the 2010 census, its population was 841 and it contained 318 housing units.

== Geography ==
According to the 2010 census, the township has a total area of 36.34 square miles (94.1 km^{2}), all land. The Unincorporated communities of Wallingford, Wilton, and Wilton Center are located in the township. The former settlement of Pierce was also located in Wilton Township. Major roads are Wilmington-Peotone Rd, U.S. Route 52, Elevator Rd, Tulley Rd, and Cedar Rd.

== Demographics ==
Historical population
Census	Pop.	Note	%±
2016 (est.)	828
U.S. Decennial Census

== School ==
Wilton Township does not have its own school district. It is a part of Peotone Community School District 207 - U.
