= Colloidal gold protein assay =

Gold assay finding protein concentration

The colloidal gold protein assay is a highly sensitive biochemical assay for determining the total concentration of protein in a solution (~0.1 ng/μL to 200 ng/μL). It was first described in 1987 by two groups who used commercially available "Aurodye" colloidal gold solutions. Notably, the formulation of Aurodye changed between 1987 and 1990 such that it became incompatible with protein assays, however vendors such as Bio-Rad & Diversified Biotech starting offering colloidal gold formulations that were suitable for protein assays. These products have since been discontinued and there are no vendors that currently explicitly sell colloidal gold for the assay, however detailed synthetic procedures were published to produce the ~17-40 nm gold nanoparticles that are suitable for the assay, along with modifications to increase the shelf stability of the colloidal gold & adapt the assay to microplate format & increase its sensitivity. Gold nanoparticles in the ~17-40 nm size range that are presumably compatible with the assay are currently commercially available.

== Mechanism ==
The total protein concentration is readout by an increase in absorbance at 565 nm, which can then be measured using colorimetric techniques, including using microplate readers. Most common reagents, except thiols and SDS, are compatible with the assay. An optimized formulation for the assay to maximize sensitivity in microplate format was described.

== Comparison to other assays ==
While the colloidal gold assay is the most sensitive in-solution colorimetric protein assay, it may be equally sensitive or surpassed in sensitivity by fluorescent protein assays such as the CBQCA, FQ, NanoOrange, Quant-iT, and EZQ assays.

== See also ==
- Colloidal gold
- Bradford assay
- BCA assay
