= Pierce Biotechnology =

American biotechnology company focused on protein biology

- Company type: Public (NYSE: TMO)
- Founded: 17 March 1965
- Headquarters: Waltham, Massachusetts, USA
- Key people: Marc N. Casper (President & CEO)
- Parent: Thermo Fisher Scientific
- Website: www.thermofisher.com

Pierce Biotechnology Inc. is the ultimate origin of a number of products and product lines in the Thermo Fisher Scientific research and development division, "Thermo Scientific Pierce Protein Biology." The company from which this division originated, the Rockford, Illinois-based Pierce Chemical Company (PCC) was founded in 1948 when Alan Pierce assumed active management of a company known as Midwest Extraction, which focused on isolating chlorophyll from alfalfa (to take advantage of 1930s research arguing therapeutic uses for chlorophyll in infections, burns, and amputation).

In assuming leadership of the company, Pierce transitioned the company to being a manufacturer of fine organic chemicals, giving it the PCC name in 1950. Among other advances, PCC was the first commercial manufacturer of ninhydrin for use in amino acid analysis. After the first several years, the company diversified into other products and markets. Roy Oliver succeeded Pierce as company president in 1965 (Pierce remaining affiliated with eponymous products and business units until his retirement in 1994). Under Oliver, PCC expanded its operations internationally, entering into agreements with European distributors. The company's focus began to shift in the 1970s from the manufacture of organic chemical products at scale, to research, development, and production, of high-purity reagents for biotechnology research at smaller scales—resulting in its name chance to Pierce Biotechnology (PBT). PBT became a subsidiary of Perstorp Group in the Perstorp Life Science Division, was spun off as a component of this division as Perbio Science AB, which was subsequently acquired by Fisher Scientific International in 2003.

Fisher merged with Thermo Electron in 2006, bringing some former PCC and PBT product lines of Perbio Science AB under Thermo Fisher Scientific management, as brands of its "Thermo Scientific Pierce Protein Biology" division.

== Perstorp management ==
In 1983, Perstorp, a Sweden-based chemical company, purchased Pierce. Perstorp was a manufacturer of chemicals, resins, plastics, and laminates.

In 1985, researchers at Pierce Chemical Company, led by Paul K. Smith, published a method detailing the use of bicinchoninic acid (BCA) as a protein quantitation reagent. The BCA protein assay method maintains the high sensitivity and low variability among proteins associated with the Lowry protein assay, while providing increased tolerance to the presence of non-ionic detergents and buffer salts. The BCA assay has since become one of the most widely used methods of protein quantitation.

Pierce was recognized for its international marketing efforts in 1990 when it received the US President's "E" Award for success in exporting. Only 24 "E" awards were presented nationwide that year.

In 1995, Pierce Chemical Company introduced the patented SuperSignal chemiluminescent substrate for the chemiluminescent detection of biological molecules such as antibodies or pharmaceuticals. Chemiluminescence is the emission of light that occurs when a chemical reaction (in this case, between the SuperSignal Substrate and the tagged biological molecule) yields light. Researchers preserve the light signal on X-ray film or read the signal directly using an imager. Use of chemiluminescent technology allows researchers to replace radioactive tracers for greater personal safety and much less ecological impact.

The introduction of SuperSignal Substrate was one of many product introductions that propelled Pierce Chemical Company to become a leader in the areas of protein sample preparation, protein function and modification, and protein detection. The company would soon change its name to Pierce Biotechnology, Inc. to reflect its focus and expertise on these growing areas.

In June 1998, Pierce's parent company, Perstorp AB, announced several organizational changes, including the establishment of the separate Perstorp Life Science Division, of which Pierce was a key player. In 1999, the Perstorp Life Science Division was spun off into its own company, Perbio Science AB. The new company was listed on the Stockholm Stock Exchange O List in October 1999.

== Fisher Scientific and subsequent management ==
In August 2003, Fisher Scientific International announced its intent to purchase Perbio Science AB. In November 2006, Thermo Electron and Fisher Scientific International merged to form Thermo Fisher Scientific (TFS). Today, the company formerly known as Pierce Chemical Company and Pierce Biotechnology Inc. is the TFS research and development division, "Thermo Scientific Pierce Protein Biology".
