= Pierce (given name) =

Pierce is a Greek given name. Notable people with the name include:

- Pierce A'Court-Ashe (1707–1768), British politician
- Pierce Askegren (1955–2006), American author
- Pierce M. Barron (1830–1887), American political figure
- Pierce Bird (born 1999), Northern Irish footballer
- Pierce Boshelly, American painter and sculptor
- Pierce Brodkorb (1908–1992), American ornithologist
- Pierce Brosnan (born 1953), Irish actor
- Pierce Brown (born 1988), American author
- Pierce Butler (1744–1822), Irish rice planter
- Pierce Cahill (1869–1935), American politician
- Pierce H. Deamer Jr. (1907–1986), American politician
- Pierce Dod (1683–1754), British physician
- Pierce Egan (1772–1849), British journalist
- Pierce Egan the Younger (1814–1880), English journalist
- Pierce Freelon (born 1983), American politician
- Pierce Fulton (1992–2021), American DJ
- Pierce Gagnon (born 2005), American child actor
- Pierce Grace (1885–1966), Irish Gaelic footballer and hurler
- Pierce Holt (born 1962), American football player
- Pierce Homer (born 1956), American politician
- Pierce Johnson (born 1991), American baseball pitcher
- Pierce Knox (1921–1985), American marimba player
- Pierce Lacy (1872–1956), English stockbroker
- Pierce LePage (born 1996), Canadian Olympic athlete
- Pierce Lewis (1664–1699), Welsh cleric
- Pierce Lively (1921–2016), American judge
- Pierce Lyden (1908–1998), American actor
- Pierce McCan (1882–1919), Irish politician
- Pierce McKennon (1919–1947), American flying ace
- Pierce Meade (1776–1834), Anglican priest
- Pierce A. Morrissey (1870–1956), American politician
- Pierce O'Brien-Butler (1877–1902), Irish rugby union player
- Pierce O'Leary (born 1959), Irish footballer
- Pierce O'Leary (boxer) (born 2000), Irish boxer
- Pierce Charles de Lacy O'Mahony (1850–1930), Irish politician
- Pierce Pettis (born 1954), American singer-songwriter
- Pierce Phillips (born 1992), English rugby union player
- Pierce Schenck (died 1930), American entrepreneur
- Pierce Galliard Smith (1826–1908), Scottish cleric
- Pierce Sweeney (born 1994), Irish footballer
- Pierce Tempest (1653–1717), English printseller
- Pierce Turner (born 1956), Irish singer
- Pierce Wallace (born 1995), American sports fan and television personality
- Pierce Waring (born 1998), Australian footballer
- Pierce M. B. Young (1836–1896), American-Confederate politician

== Fictional characters ==
- Pierce, an Animal Crossing villager
- Pierce Hawthorne, a main character in the American sitcom Community
- Pierce Washington, a character in the Saints Row franchise
- Pierce Wheels, a character in the Ben 10 franchise

== See also ==
- Peirce (given name)
- Pierce (surname)
