= Copper(II) sulfate =

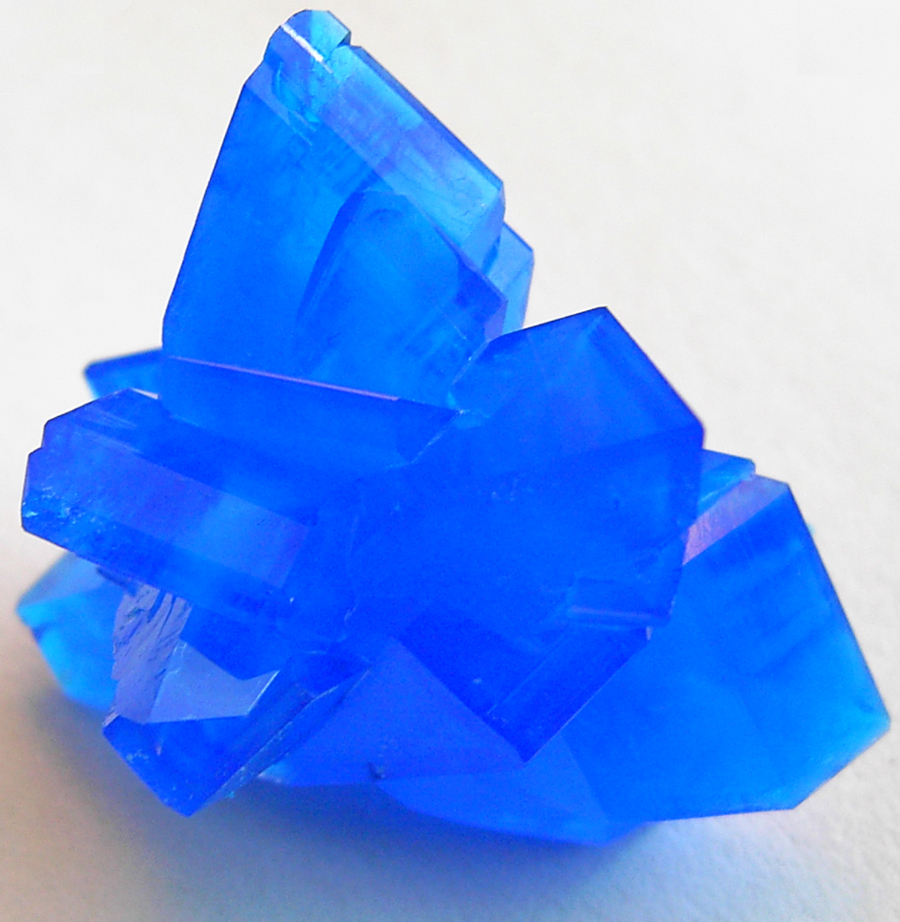
- Crystals of CuSO_{4}·5H_{2}O

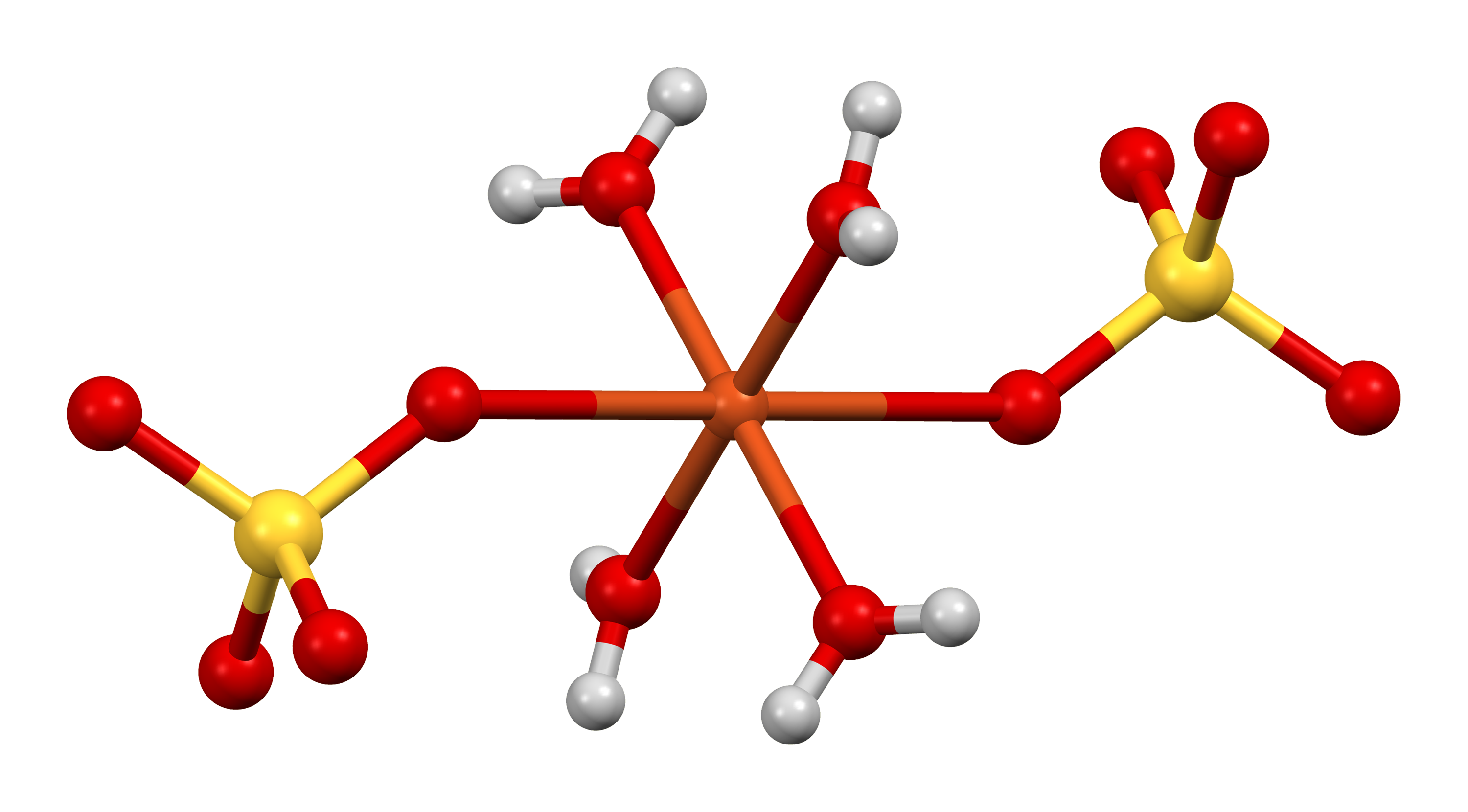
- Copper, Cu Sulfur, S Oxygen, O Hydrogen, H Portion of the structure of the pentahydrate (sulfate links Cu(H_{2}O)^{2+}_{4} centers)

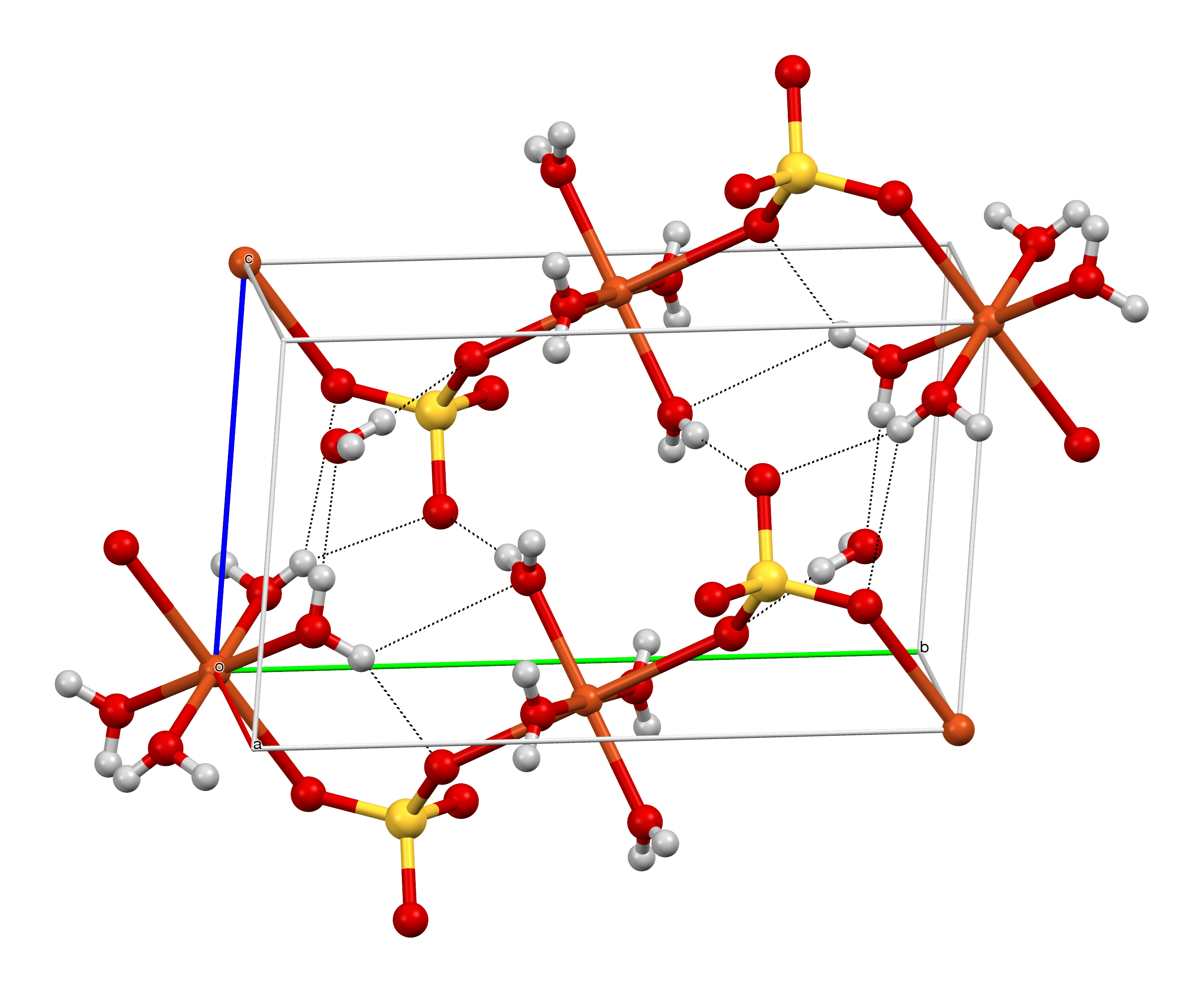
- Unit cell of the crystal structure of CuSO_{4}·5H_{2}O with hydrogen bonds in black

Names
- IUPAC name Copper(II) sulfate
- Other names: Cupric sulphate; Blue vitriol (pentahydrate); Bluestone (pentahydrate); Bonattite (trihydrate mineral); Boothite (heptahydrate mineral); Chalcanthite (pentahydrate mineral); Chalcocyanite (mineral); Copper Sulphate pentahydrate

Identifiers
| CAS Number | 7758-98-7 (anhydrous); 7758-99-8 (pentahydrate); 16448-28-5 (trihydrate); 19086-18-1 (heptahydrate) |
| 3D model (JSmol) | Interactive image |
| ChEBI | CHEBI:23414 |
| ChEMBL | ChEMBL604 |
| ChemSpider | 22870 |
| ECHA InfoCard | 100.028.952 |
| EC Number | 231-847-6 |
| Gmelin Reference | 8294 |
| KEGG | C18713 |
| PubChem CID | 24462 |
| RTECS number | GL8800000 (anhydrous) GL8900000 (pentahydrate) |
| UNII | KUW2Q3U1VV (anhydrous); LRX7AJ16DT (pentahydrate) |
| CompTox Dashboard (EPA) | DTXSID6034479 |
- InChI: InChI=1S/Cu.H2O4S/c;1-5(2,3)4/h;(H2,1,2,3,4)/q+2;/p-2 Key: ARUVKPQLZAKDPS-UHFFFAOYSA-L; InChI=1/Cu.H2O4S/c;1-5(2,3)4/h;(H2,1,2,3,4)/q+2;/p-2 Key: ARUVKPQLZAKDPS-NUQVWONBAI
- SMILES: [O-]S(=O)(=O)[O-].[Cu+2]

Properties
| Chemical formula | CuSO_{4} (anhydrous); CuSO_{4}·5H_{2}O (pentahydrate) |
| Molar mass | 159.60 g/mol (anhydrous); 249.685 g/mol (pentahydrate) |
| Appearance | gray-white (anhydrous) blue (pentahydrate) |
| Density | 3.60 g/cm^{3} (anhydrous); 2.286 g/cm^{3} (pentahydrate) |
| Melting point | 110 °C (decomposes); 560 °C (pentahydrate, decomposes); 590 °C (anhydrous, fully decomposes) |
| Boiling point | decomposes to cupric oxide at 650 °C |
| Solubility in water | pentahydrate 316 g/L (0 °C); 2033 g/L (100 °C) anhydrous 168 g/L (10 °C); 201 g/L (20 °C); 404 g/L (60 °C); 770 g/L (100 °C) |
| Solubility | anhydrous insoluble in ethanol pentahydrate soluble in methanol 10.4 g/L (18 °C) insoluble in ethanol and acetone |
| Magnetic susceptibility (χ) | 1330·10^{−6} cm^{3}/mol |
| Refractive index (n_{D}) | 1.724–1.739 (anhydrous); 1.514–1.544 (pentahydrate) |

Structure
| Crystal structure | Orthorhombic (anhydrous, chalcocyanite), space group Pnma, oP24, a = 0.839 nm, b = 0.669 nm, c = 0.483 nm. Triclinic (pentahydrate), space group P1̅, aP22, a = 0.5986 nm, b = 0.6141 nm, c = 1.0736 nm, α = 77.333°, β = 82.267°, γ = 72.567° |

Thermochemistry
| Std molar entropy (S^{⦵}_{298}) | 5 J/(K·mol) |
| Std enthalpy of formation (Δ_{f}H^{⦵}_{298}) | −769.98 kJ/mol |

Pharmacology
| ATC code | V03AB20 (WHO) |

Hazards
- GHS labelling
| Pictograms | (GHS05: Corrosive) (GHS07: Exclamation mark) (GHS09: Environmental hazard) |
| Signal word | Danger |
| Hazard statements | H302, H315, H318, H319, H410 |
| Precautionary statements | P264, P264+P265, P270, P273, P280, P301+P317, P302+P352, P305+P351+P338, P305+P354+P338, P317, P321, P330, P332+P317, P337+P317, P362+P364, P391, P501 |
| NFPA 704 (fire diamond) | 2 0 1 |
| Flash point | Non-flammable |
- Lethal dose or concentration (LD, LC)
| LD_{50} (median dose) | 300 mg/kg (oral, rat); 87 mg/kg (oral, mouse) |
- NIOSH (US health exposure limits)
| PEL (Permissible) | TWA 1 mg/m^{3} (as Cu) |
| REL (Recommended) | TWA 1 mg/m^{3} (as Cu) |
| IDLH (Immediate danger) | TWA 100 mg/m^{3} (as Cu) |
| Safety data sheet (SDS) | anhydrous pentahydrate |

Related compounds
| Other cations | Iron(II) sulfate; Manganese(II) sulfate; Nickel(II) sulfate; Zinc sulfate |
- Except where otherwise noted, data are given for materials in their standard state (at 25 °C [77 °F], 100 kPa). verify (what is ?) Infobox references

Copper(II) sulfate is an inorganic compound with the chemical formula CuSO_{4}. It forms hydrates CuSO_{4}·nH_{2}O, where n can range from 1 to 7. The pentahydrate (n = 5), a bright blue crystal, is the most commonly encountered hydrate of copper(II) sulfate, while its anhydrous form is white. Older names for the pentahydrate include blue vitriol, bluestone, vitriol of copper, and Roman vitriol. It exothermically dissolves in water to give the aquo complex [Cu(H_{2}O)_{6}]^{2+}, which has octahedral molecular geometry. The structure of the solid pentahydrate reveals a polymeric structure wherein copper is again octahedral but bound to four water ligands. The Cu(II)(H_{2}O)_{4} centers are interconnected by sulfate anions to form chains.

== Preparation and occurrence ==
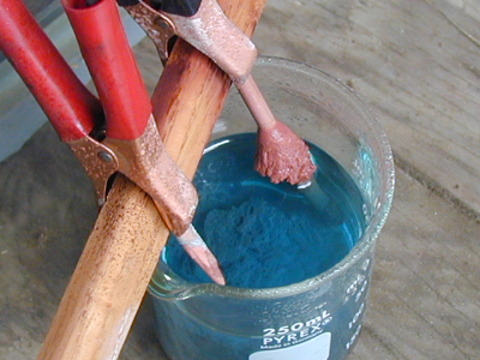
Preparation of copper(II) sulfate by electrolyzing sulfuric acid, using copper electrodes

Copper sulfate is produced industrially by treating copper metal with hot concentrated sulfuric acid or copper oxides with dilute sulfuric acid. For laboratory use, copper sulfate is usually purchased. Copper sulfate can also be produced by slowly leaching low-grade copper ore in air; bacteria may be used to hasten the process.

Commercial copper sulfate is usually about 98% pure copper sulfate, and may contain traces of water. Anhydrous copper sulfate is 39.81% copper and 60.19% sulfate by mass, and in its blue, hydrous form, it is 25.47% copper, 38.47% sulfate (12.82% sulfur) and 36.06% water by mass. Four types of crystal size are provided based on its usage: large crystals (10–40 mm), small crystals (2–10 mm), snow crystals (less than 2 mm), and windswept powder (less than 0.15 mm).

== Chemical properties ==
Copper(II) sulfate pentahydrate decomposes before melting. It loses two water molecules upon heating at 63 °C (145 °F), followed by two more at 109 °C (228 °F) and the final water molecule at 200 °C (392 °F).

The chemistry of aqueous copper sulfate is simply that of copper aquo complex, since the sulfate is not bound to copper in such solutions. Thus, such solutions react with concentrated hydrochloric acid to give tetrachlorocuprate(II):

Cu^{2+} + 4 Cl^{−} → CuCl_{4}^{2−}

Similarly treatment of such solutions with zinc gives metallic copper, as described by this simplified equation:

CuSO_{4} + Zn → Cu + ZnSO_{4}

A further illustration of such single metal replacement reactions occurs when a piece of iron is submerged in a solution of copper sulfate:

Fe(s) + CuSO_{4}(aq) → FeSO_{4}(aq) + Cu(s)

In high school and general chemistry education, copper sulfate is used as an electrolyte for galvanic cells, usually as a cathode solution. For example, in a zinc/copper cell, copper ion in copper sulfate solution absorbs electron from zinc and forms metallic copper.

Cu^{2+}(aq) + 2 e^{−} → Cu(cathode), E^{~~o~~}_{cell} = 0.34 V

Copper sulfate is commonly included in teenage chemistry sets and undergraduate experiments. It is often used to grow crystals in schools and in Copper electroplating experiments despite its toxicity. Copper sulfate is often used to demonstrate an exothermic reaction, in which steel wool or magnesium ribbon is placed in an aqueous solution of CuSO_{4}. It is used to demonstrate the principle of mineral hydration. The pentahydrate form, which is blue, is heated, turning the copper sulfate into the anhydrous form which is white, while the water that was present in the pentahydrate form evaporates. When water is then added to the anhydrous compound, it turns back into the pentahydrate form, regaining its blue color. Copper(II) sulfate pentahydrate can easily be produced by crystallization from solution as copper(II) sulfate, which is hygroscopic.

== Uses ==
=== As a fungicide and herbicide ===
Copper sulfate has been used for control of algae in lakes and related fresh waters subject to eutrophication. It "remains the most effective algicidal treatment".

Bordeaux mixture, a suspension of copper(II) sulfate (CuSO_{4}) and calcium hydroxide (Ca(OH)_{2}), is used to control fungus on grapes, melons, and other berries. It is produced by mixing a water solution of copper sulfate and a suspension of slaked lime.

A dilute solution of copper sulfate is used to treat aquarium fishes for parasitic infections, and is also used to remove snails from aquariums and zebra mussels from water pipes. Copper ions are highly toxic to fish. Most species of algae can be controlled with very low concentrations of copper sulfate.

=== Analytical reagent ===
Several chemical tests utilize copper sulfate. It is used in Fehling's solution and Benedict's solution to test for reducing sugars, which reduce the soluble blue copper(II) sulfate to insoluble red copper(I) oxide. Copper(II) sulfate is also used in the Biuret reagent to test for proteins.

Copper sulfate is used to test blood for anemia. The blood is dropped into a solution of copper sulfate of known specific gravity—blood with sufficient hemoglobin sinks rapidly due to its density, whereas blood which sinks slowly or not at all has an insufficient amount of hemoglobin. Clinically relevant, however, modern laboratories utilize automated blood analyzers for accurate quantitative hemoglobin determinations, as opposed to older qualitative means.

In a flame test, the copper ions of copper sulfate emit a deep green light, a much deeper green than the flame test for barium.

=== Organic synthesis ===
Copper sulfate is employed at a limited level in organic synthesis. The anhydrous salt is used as a dehydrating agent for forming and manipulating acetal groups. The hydrated salt can be intimately mingled with potassium permanganate to give an oxidant for the conversion of primary alcohols.

=== Rayon production ===
Reaction with ammonium hydroxide can yield tetraamminecopper(II) sulfate and Schweizer's reagent (nonsulphurous), which is used to dissolve cellulose in the industrial production of Rayon.

=== Niche uses ===
Copper(II) sulfate has attracted many niche applications over the centuries. In industry copper sulfate has multiple applications. In printing it is an additive to book-binding pastes and glues to protect paper from insect bites; in building it is used as an additive to concrete to improve water resistance and prevent plant and mushroom growth. Copper sulfate can be used as a coloring ingredient in artworks, especially glasses and potteries. Copper sulfate is also rarely used in firework manufacture as a blue coloring agent, but it is not safe to mix copper(II) sulfate with metal powders, or it or any copper(II) compound with chlorates; the sulfate and other copper(II) compounds are not allowed in chlorate containing mixtures in the US.

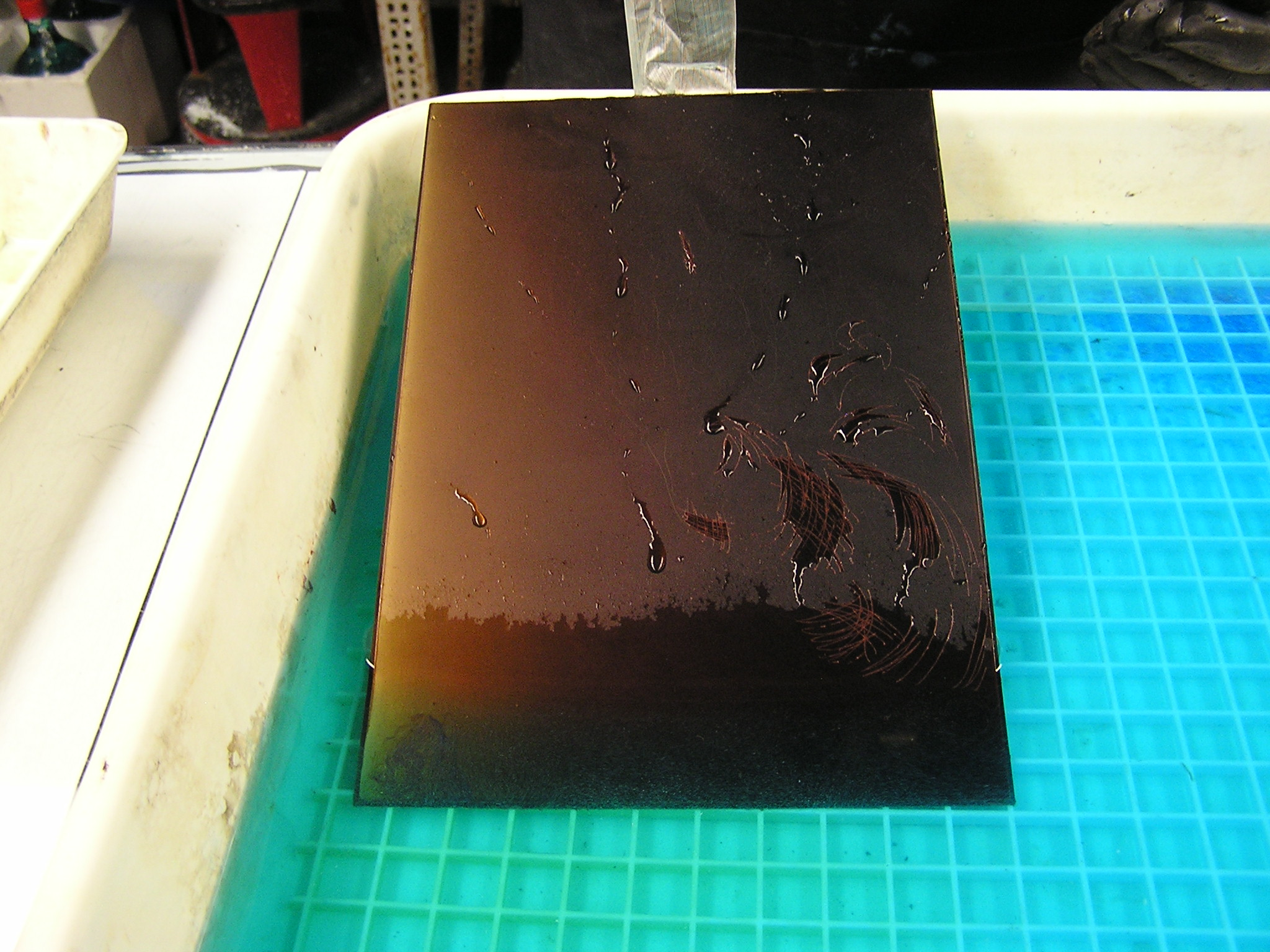
Lowering a copper etching plate into the copper sulfate solution

Copper sulfate was once used to kill bromeliads, which serve as mosquito breeding sites. Copper sulfate is used as a molluscicide to treat bilharzia in tropical countries.

==== Art ====
In 2008, the artist Roger Hiorns filled an abandoned waterproofed council flat in London with 75,000 liters of copper(II) sulfate water solution. The solution was left to crystallize for several weeks before the flat was drained, leaving crystal-covered walls, floors and ceilings. The work is titled Seizure. Since 2011, it has been on exhibition at the Yorkshire Sculpture Park.

==== Etching ====
Copper(II) sulfate is used to etch zinc, aluminium, or copper plates for intaglio printmaking. It is also used to etch designs into copper for jewelry, such as for Champlevé.

==== Dyeing ====
Copper(II) sulfate can be used as a mordant in vegetable dyeing. It often highlights the green tints of the specific dyes.

==== Electronics ====
An aqueous solution of copper(II) sulfate is often used as the resistive element in liquid resistors.

In electronic and microelectronic industry a bath of CuSO_{4}·5H_{2}O and sulfuric acid (H_{2}SO_{4}) is often used for electrodeposition of copper.

== Other forms of copper sulfate ==
Anhydrous copper(II) sulfate can be produced by dehydration of the commonly available pentahydrate copper sulfate. In nature, it is found as the very rare mineral known as chalcocyanite. The pentahydrate also occurs in nature as chalcanthite. Other rare copper sulfate minerals include bonattite (trihydrate), boothite (heptahydrate), and the monohydrate compound poitevinite. There are numerous other, more complex, copper(II) sulfate minerals known, with environmentally important basic copper(II) sulfates like langite and posnjakite.

Forms of copper(II) sulfate
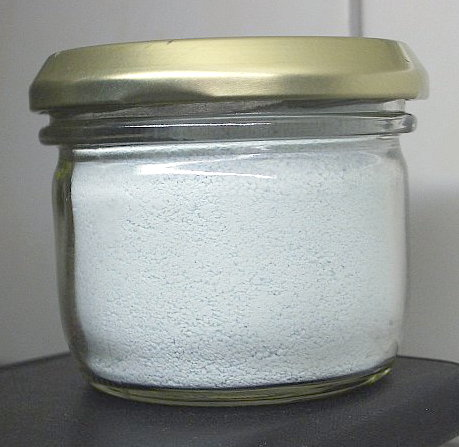
Anhydrous CuSO_{4}

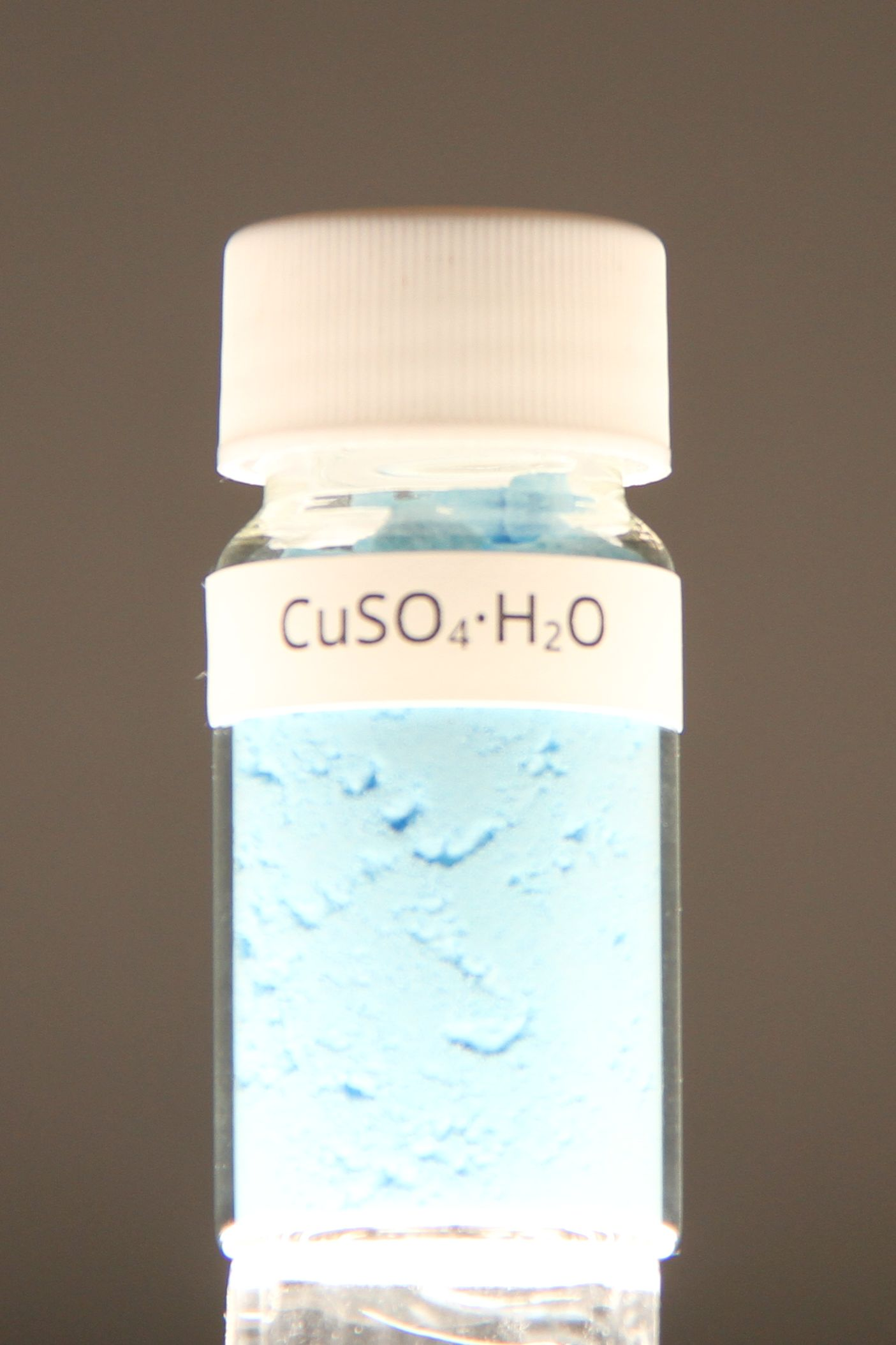
Copper(II) sulfate monohydrate

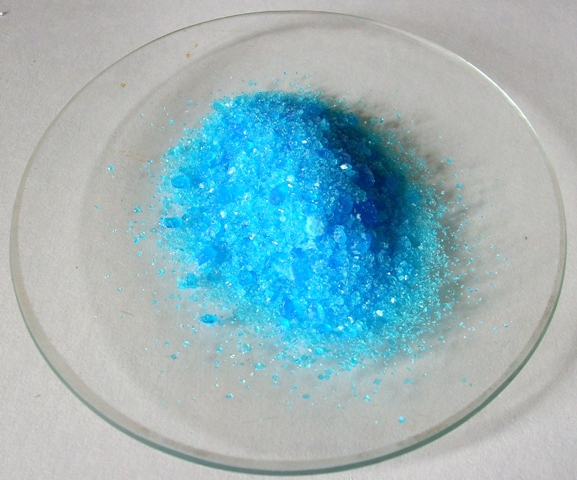
Copper(II) sulfate pentahydrate

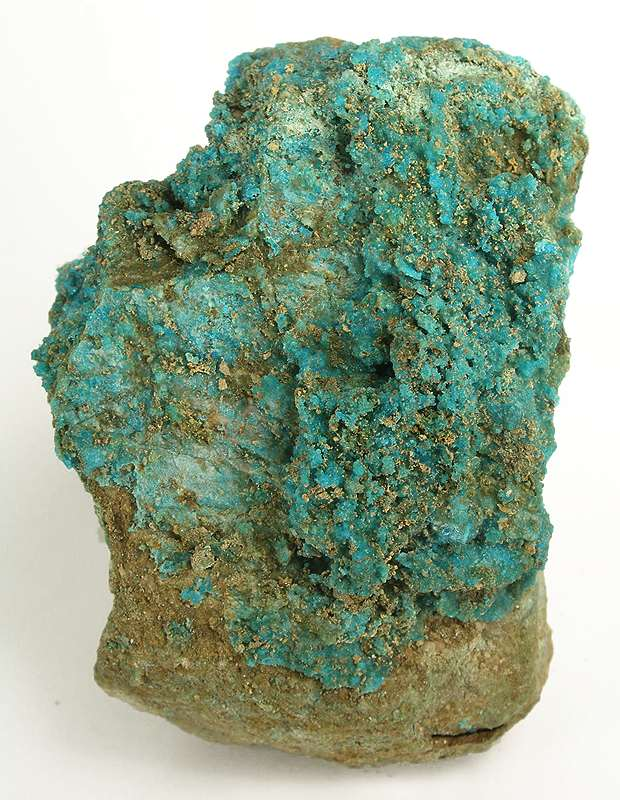
The rare mineral boothite (CuSO_{4}·7H_{2}O)

== Toxicological effects ==
Copper(II) salts have an LD50 of 100 mg/kg.

Copper(II) sulfate was used in the past as an emetic. It is now considered too toxic for this use. It is still listed as an antidote in the World Health Organization's Anatomical Therapeutic Chemical Classification System.

== See also ==
- Chalcanthum
- Vitriol

== Bibliography ==
- Haynes, William M., ed. (2011). CRC Handbook of Chemistry and Physics (92nd ed.). Boca Raton, FL: CRC Press. ISBN 978-1439855119.
