= Bicinchoninic acid =

Names
- Preferred IUPAC name [2,2′-Biquinoline]-4,4′-dicarboxylic acid
- Other names Bicinchoninic acid 4,4′-Dicarboxy-2,2′-biquinoline; 2,2'-Biquinoline-4,4'-dicarboxylic acid

Identifiers
CAS Number	1245-13-2 (free acid); 979-88-4 (disodium salt)
3D model (JSmol)	Interactive image
ChEMBL	ChEMBL431482
ChemSpider	64223
ECHA InfoCard	100.013.628
PubChem CID	71068
UNII	CX56TX9Y1I
CompTox Dashboard (EPA)	DTXSID8061638
- InChI: InChI=1S/C20H12N2O4/c23-19(24)13-9-17(21-15-7-3-1-5-11(13)15)18-10-14(20(25)26)12-6-2-4-8-16(12)22-18/h1-10H,(H,23,24)(H,25,26) Key: AFYNADDZULBEJA-UHFFFAOYSA-N
- SMILES: O=C(O)c1cc(nc2c1cccc2)c3nc4ccccc4c(c3)C(=O)O

Properties
Chemical formula	C_{20}H_{12}N_{2}O_{4}
Molar mass	344.326 g·mol^{−1}
Appearance	Cream colored powder
Odor	Characteristic odor
Melting point	352 °C (666 °F; 625 K) decomposes
Solubility in water	Partially soluble in cold water, hot water

Hazards
- Occupational safety and health (OHS/OSH)
Main hazards	Will irritate eyes and mucous membranes.
NFPA 704 (fire diamond)	1
Safety data sheet (SDS)	External MSDS
- Except where otherwise noted, data are given for materials in their standard state (at 25 °C [77 °F], 100 kPa). verify (what is ?) Infobox references

Bicinchoninic acid (/baɪsɪnkɔːnɪnɪk/) or BCA is a weak acid composed of two carboxylated quinoline rings. It is an organic compound with the formula (C_{9}H_{5}NCO_{2}H)_{2}. The molecule consists of a pair of quinoline rings, each bearing a carboxylic acid group. Its sodium salt forms a purple complex with cuprous ions.

Bicinchoninic acid is most commonly employed in the bicinchoninic acid (BCA) assay, which is used to determine the total concentration of protein in a solution. Bicinchoninic acid is used to detect the presence of cuprous ions, due to its purple coloration via a biuret reaction. In this assay, two molecules of bicinchoninic acid chelate a single Cu^{+} ion, forming a purple water-soluble complex that strongly absorbs light at 562 nm.
