= Stephen Pearse =

American entrepreneur

Stephen G. Pearse
- Born: United States
- Education: Massachusetts Institute of Technology, Georgia Institute of Technology, and Stevens Institute of Technology
- Occupations: Entrepreneur, venture capitalist
- Known for: CEO of Cyras Systems and Member of the NASA Advisory Council member
- Spouse: Cristina Pearse

Stephen G. Pearse is an American entrepreneur, venture capitalist, and board member in the telecommunications, biotechnology, clean energy sectors. He is recognized for guiding companies through major acquisitions, serving on national advisory boards, and supporting innovation in both private and public sectors.

== Early years and education ==
Pearse obtained degrees from the Massachusetts Institute of Technology, Georgia Institute of Technology, and Stevens Institute of Technology.

== Career ==
=== Early career ===
Pearse began his career in the telecommunications industry. He served as Vice President of Technology Planning at Sprint and later became Senior Vice President of Engineering, Operations, and IT at Time Warner Telecom. He also held the role of Executive Vice President and General Manager of Nortel Networks’ Internet/Telecom Business Group, overseeing parts of the integration of Bay Networks and Nortel.

=== Cyras Systems ===
Pearse is best known for leading Cyras Systems, a telecommunications start-up. As CEO, he guided the company from early funding through eventual acquisition by Ciena Corporation in 2000.

He was also involved in other exits, including Revolv, Inc., later acquired by Google in 2014.

=== Later ventures and board roles ===
He has served as Chairman of Maxwell Biosciences, a biotechnology company, and was Chairman of Innovation Pavilion. Techtonic Group LLC,

In 2024, Pearse became Managing Director of Yucatan Rock Ventures, a venture investment firm.

He has also held directorships with various companies.

=== Advisory and governmental roles ===
In 2013, Pearse was appointed to the NASA Advisory Council. In 2024, he joined the inaugural Board of Directors of the Foundation for Energy Security and Innovation (FESI), a nonprofit established by the U.S. Department of Energy under the CHIPS and Science Act.

== Personal life ==
Pearse is married to Cristina Pearse.
