= Pierce Township =

Pierce Township may refer to the following places in the United States:

- Pierce Township, DeKalb County, Illinois
- Pierce Township, Washington County, Indiana
- Pierce Township, Page County, Iowa
- Pierce Township, Texas County, Missouri
- Pierce Township, Stone County, Missouri
- Pierce Township, Lawrence County, Missouri
- Pierce Township, Barnes County, North Dakota
- Pierce Township, Clermont County, Ohio

== See also ==
- Piercetown (disambiguation)
