= Rupert Pearse =

British medical researcher

Rupert Mark Pearse OBE is a British physician specialising in intensive care medicine, and NIHR Professor of Intensive Care Medicine at Queen Mary University of London.

Pearse graduated from St George's, University of London, in 1996.

He is the founding director of the Perioperative Medicine Clinical Trials Network and is involved in a number of large multi-centre studies including PRISM, OPTIMISE II, and EPOCH.

Pearse was appointed Officer of the Order of the British Empire (OBE) in the 2024 New Year Honours for services to intensive care medicine.
