= Pearse Park =

Pearse Park may refer to:

- Pearse Park (Arklow), a GAA stadium in Arklow, County Wicklow, Ireland, also called Pearse's Park
- Pearse Park (Ballybay), a GAA stadium in Ballybay, County Monaghan, Ireland
- Pearse Park (Longford), a GAA stadium in Longford, Ireland
- Pearse Park, a disused GAA ground in Eastfield, South Lanarkshire, Scotland

== See also ==
- Pearse Stadium, Galway
