= Biuret test =

Chemical test for detecting peptide bonds

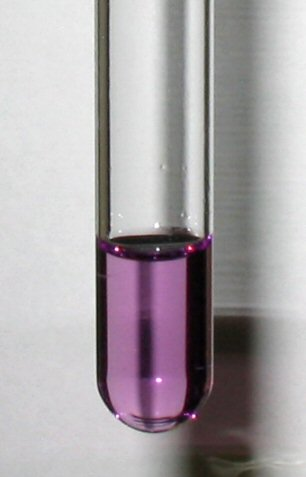
The characteristic color of a positive biuret test

In chemistry, the biuret test (IPA: /ˌbaɪjəˈrɛt/, /ˈbaɪjəˌrɛt/), also known as Piotrowski's test, is a chemical test used for detecting the presence of at least two peptide bonds in a molecule. In the presence of peptides, a copper(II) ion forms mauve-colored coordination complexes in an alkaline solution. The reaction was first observed in 1833. In Poland, the biuret test is also known as Piotrowski's test in honor of the Polish physiologist Gustaw Piotrowski who independently rediscovered it in 1857. Several variants on the test have been developed, such as the BCA test and the Modified Lowry test.

The biuret reaction can be used to assess the concentration of proteins because peptide bonds occur with the same frequency per amino acid in the peptide. The intensity of the color, and hence the absorption at 540 nm, is directly proportional to the protein concentration, according to the Beer–Lambert law.

Despite its name, the reagent does not in fact contain biuret [(H_{2}N−CO−)_{2}NH]. The test is so named because it also gives a positive reaction to the peptide-like bonds in the biuret molecule.

In this assay, the copper(II) binds with nitrogen atoms present in the peptide bonds of proteins. In a secondary reaction, the copper(II) is reduced to copper(I). Buffers, such as Tris and ammonia interfere with this assay, therefore rendering this assay inappropriate for protein samples purified from ammonium sulfate precipitation. Due to its insensitivity and little interference by free amino acids, this assay is most useful for whole tissue samples and other sources with high protein concentration.

== Procedure ==
An aqueous sample is treated with an equal volume of 1% strong base (sodium or potassium hydroxide) followed by a few drops of aqueous copper(II) sulfate. If the solution turns purple, it contains protein. 5–160 mg/mL can be determined. Peptides with the correct length of at least 3 amino acids are necessary for a significant, measurable colour shift with these reagents.

== Biuret reagent ==
The biuret reagent is made of sodium hydroxide (NaOH) and hydrated copper(II) sulfate, together with potassium sodium tartrate, the latter of which is added to chelate and thus stabilize the cupric ions. The reaction of the cupric ions with the nitrogen atoms involved in peptide bonds leads to the displacement of the peptide hydrogen atoms under the alkaline conditions. A tri- or tetra-dentate chelation with the peptide nitrogen produces the characteristic color. This is found with dipeptides.

The reagent is commonly used in the biuret protein assay, a colorimetric test used to determine protein concentration by UV/VIS spectroscopy at wavelength 540 nm.

== High sensitivity variants of the biuret test ==
Two major modifications of the biuret test are commonly applied in modern colorimetric analysis of peptides: the bicinchoninic acid (BCA) assay and the Lowry assay. In these tests, the Cu^{+} formed during the biuret reaction reacts further with other reagents, leading to a deeper color.

In the BCA test, Cu^{+} forms a deep purple complex with bicinchoninic acid (BCA), which absorbs around 562 nm, producing the signature mauve color. The water-soluble BCA/copper complex absorbs much more strongly than the peptide/copper complex, increasing the sensitivity of the biuret test by a factor of around 100: the BCA assay allows to detect proteins in the range of 0.0005 to 2 mg/mL. Additionally, the BCA protein assay gives the important benefit of compatibility with substances such as up to 5% surfactants in protein samples.

In the Lowry protein assay, Cu^{+} is oxidized back to Cu^{2+} by Mo^{VI} in the Folin–Ciocalteu reagent, which forms molybdenum blue (Mo^{IV}). Tyrosine residues in the protein also form molybdenum blue under these circumstances. In this way, proteins can be detected in concentrations between 0.005 and 2 mg/mL. Molybdenum blue can in turn bind certain organic dyes such as malachite green and Auramine O, resulting in further amplification of the signal.

== External links and notes ==
- Gold. 1990. Organic Compounds in Biological Systems, 2nd ed. John Wiley & Sons, Inc.
- Chemical Reagents
