= Leona Heights, Oakland, California =

Neighborhood of Oakland, California, US

Coordinates: 37°47′20″N 122°10′42″W

Leona Heights is a neighborhood of Oakland in Alameda County, California. It lies at an elevation of 325 feet (99 m).
