= Percutaneous intentional extraluminal revascularization =

- Other names: PIER
- Specialty: Interventional radiology

Percutaneous intentional extraluminal revascularization is a percutaneous technique used in interventional radiology for limb salvage in patients with lower limb ischemia due to long superficial femoral artery occlusions. This method is intended for those patients who make poor candidates for infrainguinal arterial bypass surgery. A guide wire is intentionally introduced in the subintimal space, after which balloon dilatation is performed to create a new lumen for the blood to flow through. The technique is not without complications but may serve as a "temporary bypass" to provide wound healing and limb salvage.

== Indications ==
Percutaneous intentional extraluminal revascularization, or PIER, is an endovascular approach to revascularization of peripheral occlusions that may serve as an alternative to transluminal angioplasty. It is a minimally invasive procedure requiring only local anesthetic, which proves to be a major advantage over invasive surgical bypass procedures. Endovascular approaches, both extraluminal and transluminal, are usually indicated in patients who cannot tolerate the gold-standard treatment of surgical bypass, usually due to comorbid medical conditions that make them unsuitable for surgery.

Typically, PIER is considered an indication when the transluminal approach is unable to be achieved due to anatomical complexity of the occluding lesion. Research has shown comparable outcomes between extraluminal and transluminal approaches when the extraluminal technique is used in more complex cases, however, the current literature is lacking in data when comparing these two techniques in clinically comparable lesions.

== Risks/Complications ==
Risks of the PIER procedure include those associated with all endovascular procedures, with the overall complication rate ranging between 8-17%. Some common complications are listed below:

- Hematoma of the groin at the access site
- Arterial perforation
- Distal embolism
- Pseudoaneurysm
- Retroperitoneal bleeding
- Myocardial infarction

== Technique ==
Although variations of the procedure exist depending on physician preference and patient anatomy, a common technique for PIER of the superficial femoral artery is briefly outlined below.

Entry is made in an antegrade fashion into the common femoral artery near the mid-femoral head using a 5-French rigid catheter with an angulated tip. The catheter is advanced to the proximal portion of the SFA, proximal to the occlusion. The catheter tip is then advanced into the extraluminal, or subintimal, space. Adequate positioning is confirmed with injections of contrast.

Once the catheter is in the extraluminal space, a guidewire is advanced in a loop configuration which allows for a more rigid structure that can be used to traverse the subintimal dissection plane when compared to the free end of a straight guidewire. The looped guidewire is further advanced towards the patent portion of the artery distal to the occlusion, where re-entry into the true lumen can now be achieved. To avoid bleeding complications in the event of arterial perforation, heparin is only administered once re-entry into the true lumen is confirmed. The false lumen created in the subintimal space is then dilated with a balloon catheter.

== Recovery ==
A systematic review of 23 studies investigating subintimal angioplasty performed for occlusions in the femoral, femoropopliteal, and crural arteries found that the extraluminal technique achieves clinically similar outcomes as the transluminal approach.

- 80-90% achieved technical success, defined as adequate antegrade flow post-procedure identified by imaging
- 50-70% achieved clinical success, defined as relief of claudication, pain at rest, and healing of ulcers
- 80-90% achieved limb salvage after 1 year

== History ==
Percutaneous intentional extraluminal revascularization was first described in 1990 as an alternative to transluminal angioplasty. Up until that point, the widely accepted technique was to remain within the lumen of the artery, with accidental entry of the catheter into the subintimal space typically being an indication to abort the procedure. However, the early literature reports a case where accidental entry of the catheter into the subintimal space and subsequent return into the true lumen led to successful revascularization after the angioplasty balloon was inflated within the subintimal space.

== See also ==
- Angioplasty
- Peripheral vascular disease
