= Peirce (given name) =

Peirce is a given name. Notable people with the name include:

- Peirce Crosby (1824–1899), U.S. Navy rear admiral
- Peirce F. Lewis (1927–2018), American geographer
- Peirce Lynch (fl. 1485–1486), Irish politician
- Peirce Ó Caiside (died 1504), Gaelic-Irish physician and writer

== See also ==
- Pearce (given name)
- Pierce (given name)
- Peirce (surname)
