= Brian Pearse =

British businessman (born 1933)

Sir Brian Gerald Pearse (born 23 August 1933) is a British businessman who was the former chief executive of Midland Bank in the early 1990s.

== Early life ==
Pearse was born on 23 August 1933 in West Derby, where he grew up. He had two sisters who remained in Liverpool. Pearse supported Everton.

He attended St Edward's College, a Catholic direct grant grammar school in Liverpool from 1945 to 1950.

== Career ==
Pearse started at Martins Bank at the age of 17, for 15 years, starting at branch on Victoria St in Liverpool, moving to Leicester and Birmingham.

=== Barclays Bank ===
Martins Bank became part of Barclays. In 1977 he was regional general manager for the East Midlands and East Anglia. From 1979-82 he was General Manager of Barclays Bank UK, after the chief executive of Barclays Bank International in the US. In 1987 he was finance director of Barclays.

=== Midland Bank ===
Sir Kit McMahon left as chairman and chief executive of Midland Bank on 5 March 1991, after Midland was the first British bank in fifty years to cut its dividend (by a half). Midland had a 90% drop in profits to £63m.

He became chief executive of Midland Bank on 6 March 1991. Midland employed 60,000 people worldwide. He was aged 57 when he became chief executive. Five per cent of Midland customers had a mortgage with the bank; he wanted that to be 25%.

At 9pm on Thursday 22 August 1991 he appeared in an hour-long Channel 4 documentary entitled The Decline of the Midland Bank; the bank had suffered from the decline of the UK's manufacturing base, so the bank had made international acquisitions to counteract this. Midland had been the world's biggest bank in the 1930s. Crocker National Bank, of California, had been bought by Midland in 1981 for £485m; it was sold in 1986 for a billion-dollar loss.

In mid-March 1992 HSBC announced its take-over of the Midland Bank. HSBC had bought its first stake in 1987 for 14.7% of Midland Bank, costing £383m. The take-over deal went through on Thursday 9 July 1992.

He left Midland in March 1994, with the former chairman of BP becoming the chairman in June 1991. He was replaced by his deputy Keith Whitson. The chairman Sir Peter Walters left at the same time, being succeeded by Sir William Purves.

== Personal life ==
Pearse is married with three children. He lived in a village near Guildford with wife Pat.

He was knighted in the 1994 New Year Honours.

== See also ==
- Sir Derek Wanless, chief executive of NatWest from 1992-99
