= Lowry protein assay =

Biochemical colorimetric method

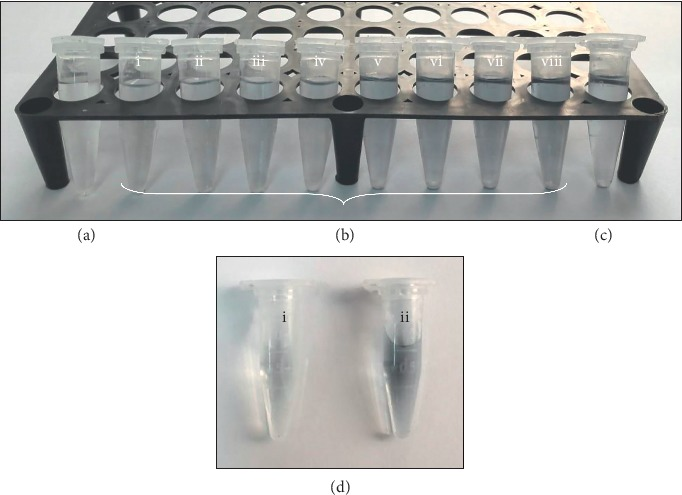
Lowry protein assay in microtubes

The Lowry protein assay is a biochemical assay for determining the total level of protein in a solution. The total protein concentration is exhibited by a color change of the sample solution in proportion to protein concentration, which can then be measured using colorimetric techniques. It is named for the biochemist Oliver H. Lowry who developed the reagent in the 1940s. His 1951 paper describing the technique is the most-highly cited paper ever in the scientific literature, cited over 300,000 times.

== Mechanism ==
The method combines the reactions of copper ions with the peptide bonds under alkaline conditions (the Biuret test) with the oxidation of aromatic protein residues. The Lowry method is based on the reaction of Cu^{+}, produced by the oxidation of peptide bonds, with Folin–Ciocalteu reagent (a mixture of phosphotungstic acid and phosphomolybdic acid in the Folin–Ciocalteu reaction). The reaction mechanism is not well understood, but involves reduction of the Folin–Ciocalteu reagent and oxidation of aromatic residues (mainly tryptophan, also tyrosine).

Proper caution must be taken when dealing with the Folin's reagent, which is only active in acidic conditions. Although this is true, the reduction reaction, as previously mentioned, will only occur in basic pH 10. Thus, the reduction must occur before the reagent breaks down. Mixing the protein solution as the Folin's reagent is simultaneously added will ensure that the reaction occurs in the desired manner.

Experiments have shown that cysteine is also reactive to the reagent. Therefore, cysteine residues in protein probably also contribute to the absorbance seen in the Lowry assay. The result of this reaction is an intense blue molecule known as heteropolymolybdenum Blue. The concentration of the reduced Folin reagent (heteropolymolybdenum Blue) is measured by absorbance at 660 nm. As a result, the total concentration of protein in the sample can be deduced from the concentration of tryptophan and tyrosine residues that reduce the Folin–Ciocalteu reagent.

The method was first proposed by Lowry in 1951. The bicinchoninic acid assay and the Hartree–Lowry assay are subsequent modifications of the original Lowry procedure.

== See also ==
- Biuret test
- Bradford protein assay
