= Pierce Boshelly =

American painter and sculptor

Pierce Boshelly is an American painter and sculptor (1961–present). He also is a composer of solo piano music and piano trios.

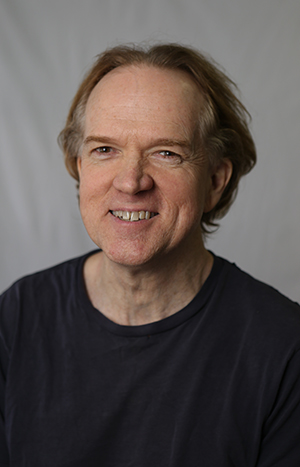
Pierce Boshelly 2017

After his formal education in physics, he returned to his early interest in photography and soon began drawing and painting. Shortly thereafter, he started carving marble at several marble studios in Italy (see Studio Sem, marble studio stagetti). He also worked at the Belfiore Foundry in Pietrasanta. In 1999, he started exhibiting paintings at local grocery stores in Carrboro, North Carolina. By 2004, he was exhibiting both painting and sculpture in New York City, Italy and North Carolina. He now has a studio in Chapel Hill, North Carolina.

== Painting ==
Boshelly has several distinctive painting styles: Fractured Realism, Curvilinear Expressionism, and Expressionism. His Fractured Realism pieces usually contain the face of a person painted realistically, but the body is composed of simple loops (curvilinear expressionism) or straight line segments.

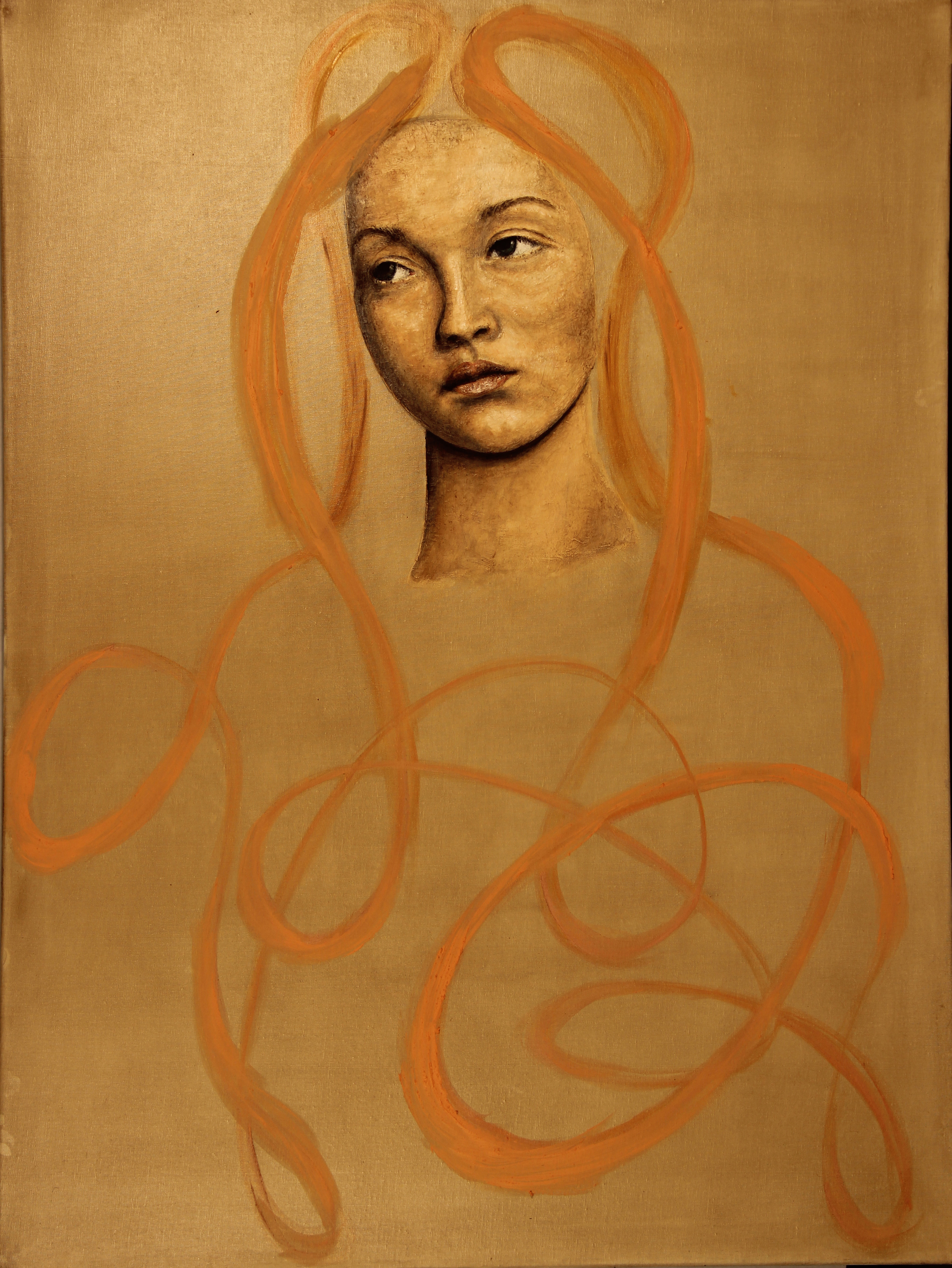
Fractured Realism

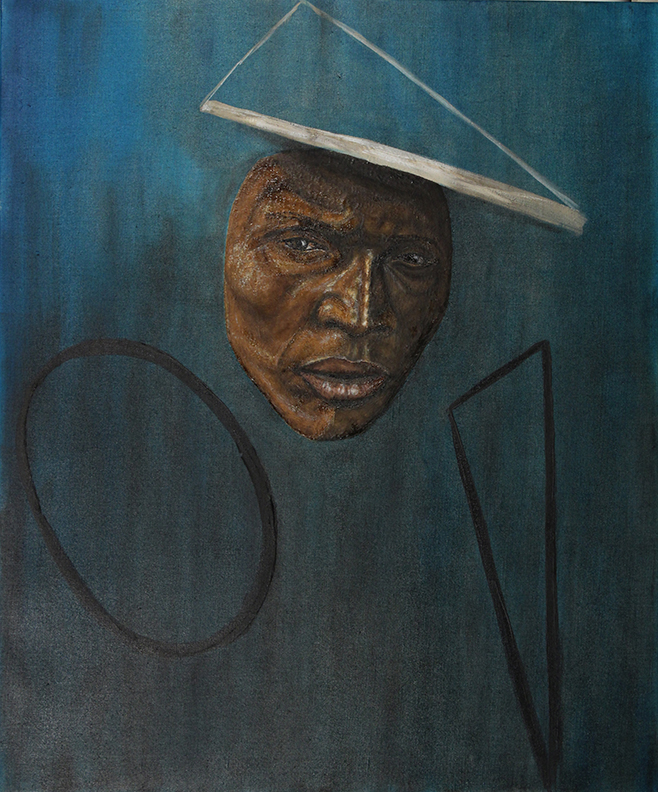
"Two triangles and an ellipse". oil on canvas

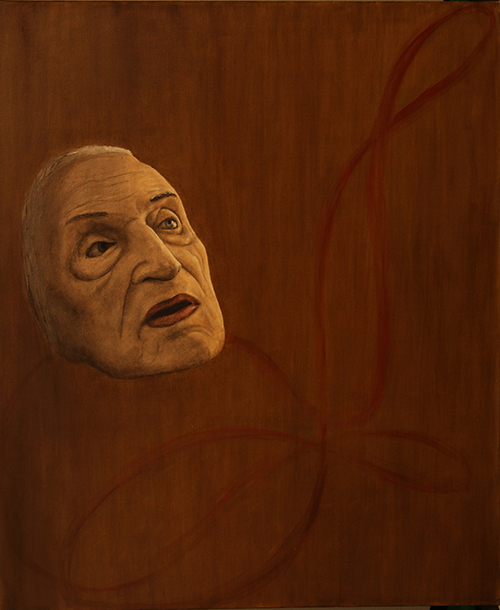
"Seeing the Light", oil on canvas

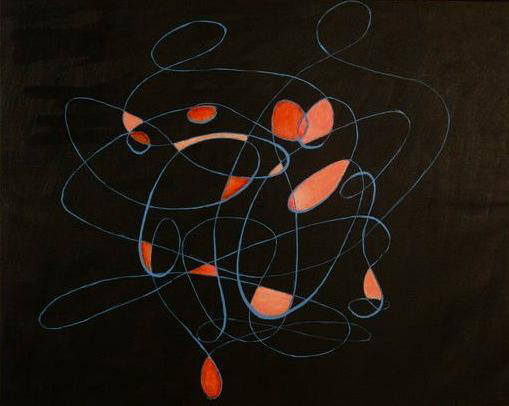
Curvilinear expressionism

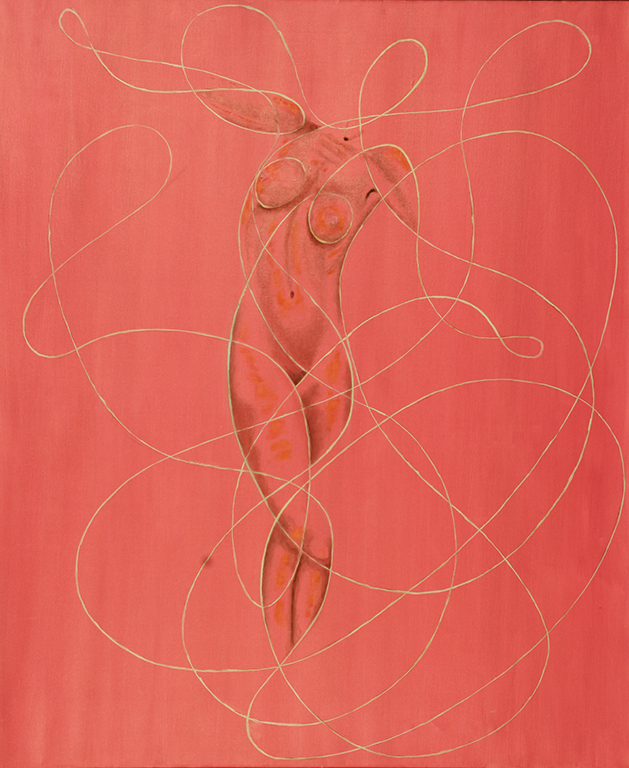
"Woman with arms Out", oil on canvas

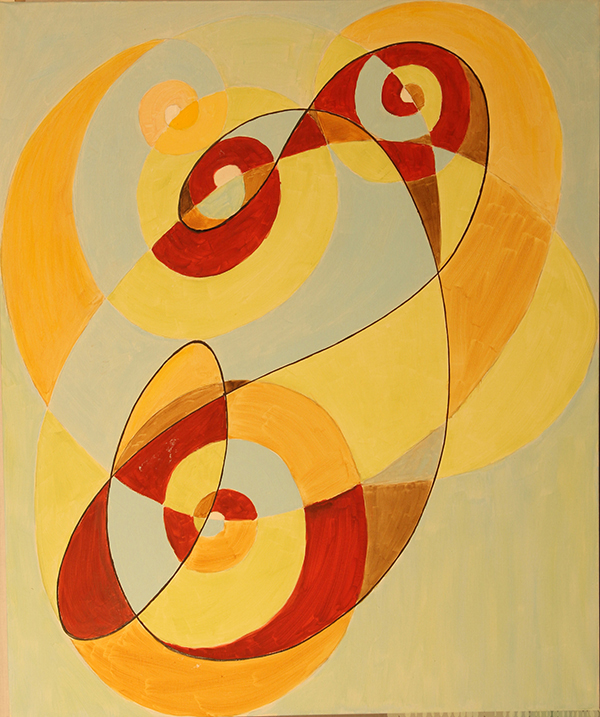
"Sitting in the Rising Sun", oil on canvas

Curvilinear Expressionism contains figures made from smooth curves that form loops. At first glance, the loops look random, but on closer inspection, the figures are discernible.

== Sculpture ==
Boshelly has several distinctive sculpture styles: Flat Minimalist, Expressionist, and Curvilinear Expressionist. The flat minimalist style is usually done in marble or plaster and portrays one figure in a simple pose. The features of the figure are very subtle and are usually made of smooth curves.

Like the Curvilinear Expressionist painting, the Curvilinear Expressionist sculpture consists of smooth curves that form random-like patterns. These are usually made from steel. The Expressionist sculptures range in style from works reminiscent of Rodins, to more individualistic pieces which look like stones piled on top of each other, to figures in a spiral shape.

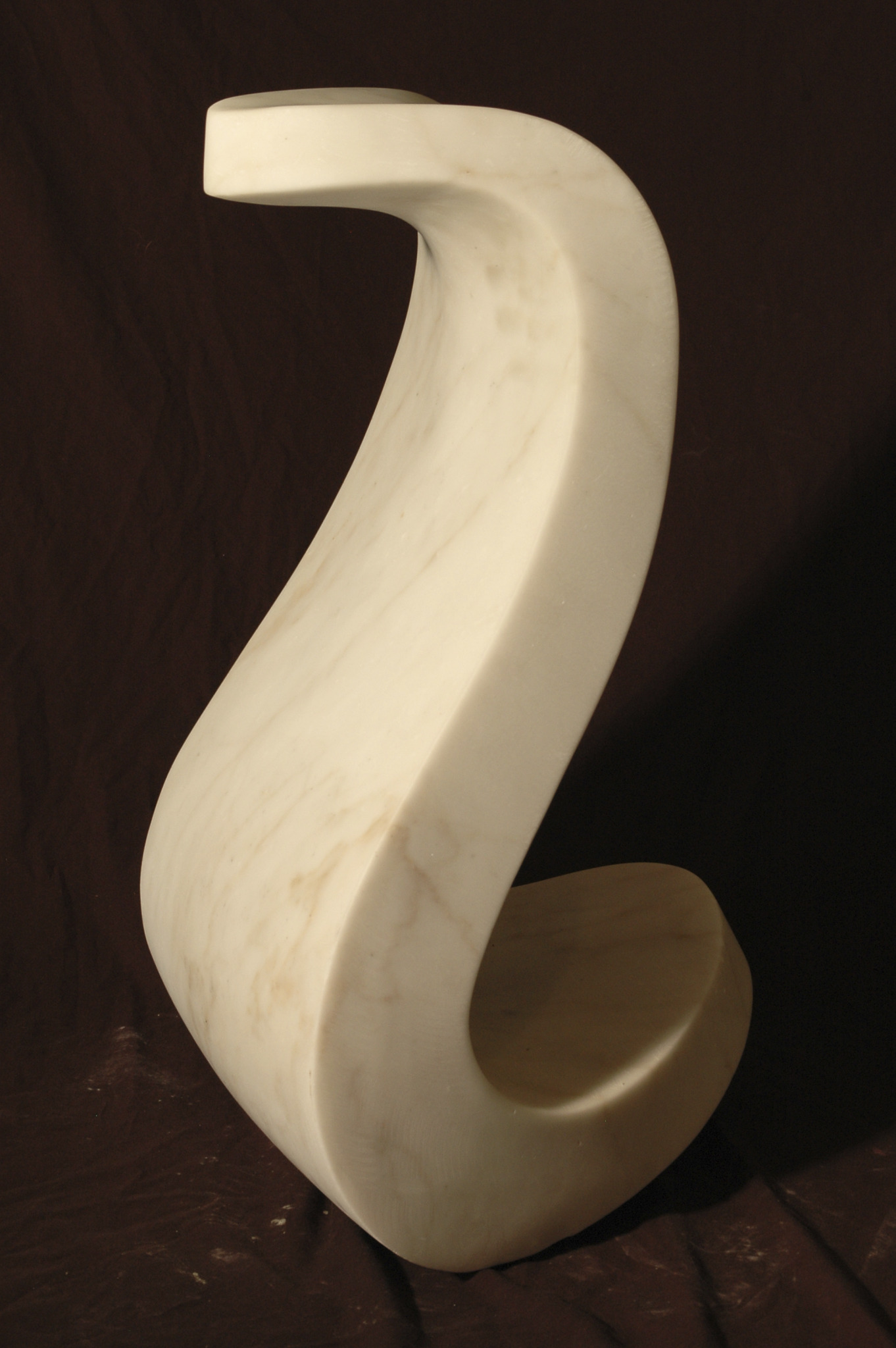
Flat Minimalist

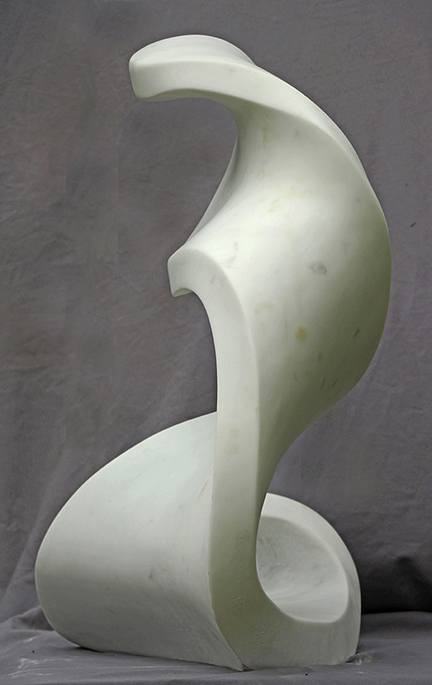
"Holding in Arms II", Carrara Statuario Marble

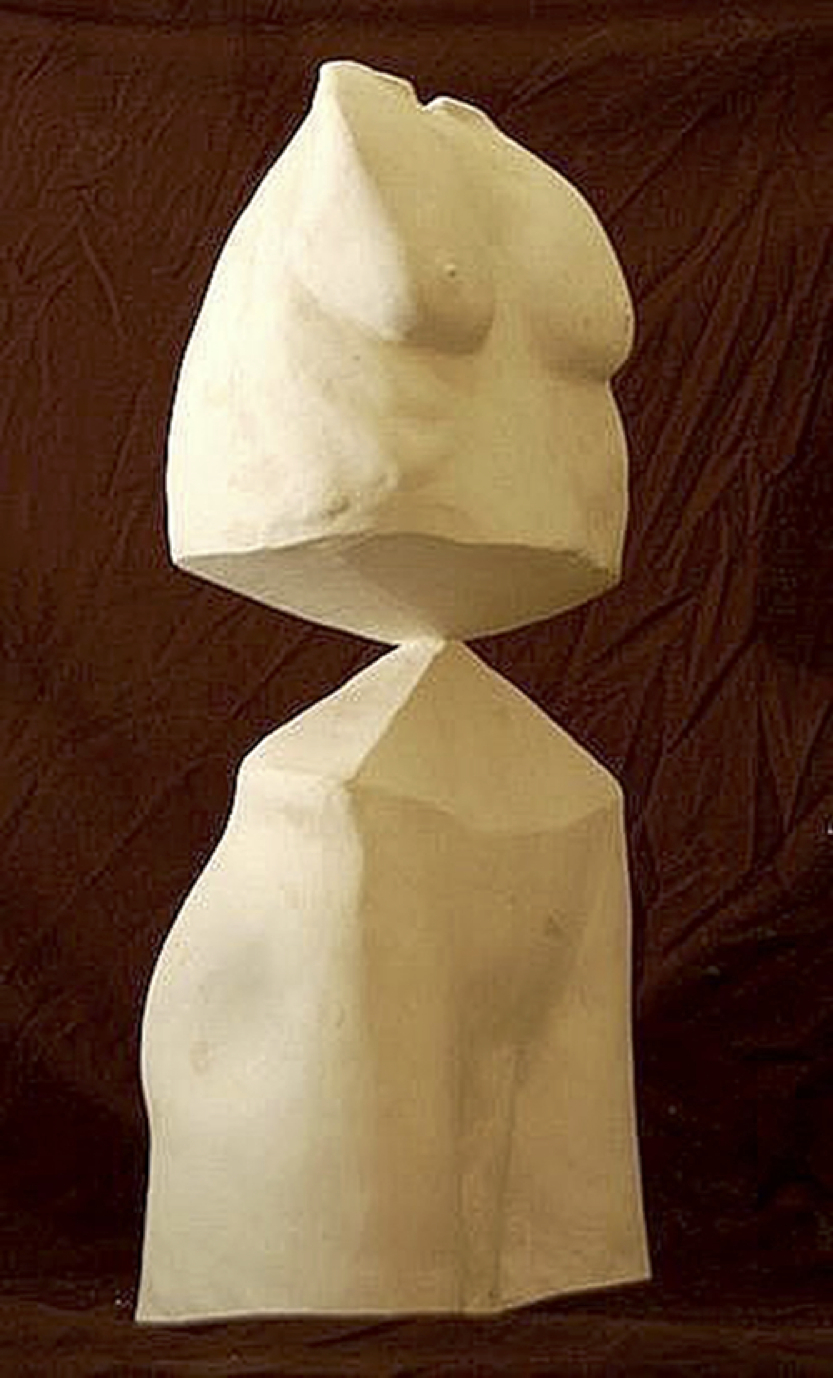
Expressionist

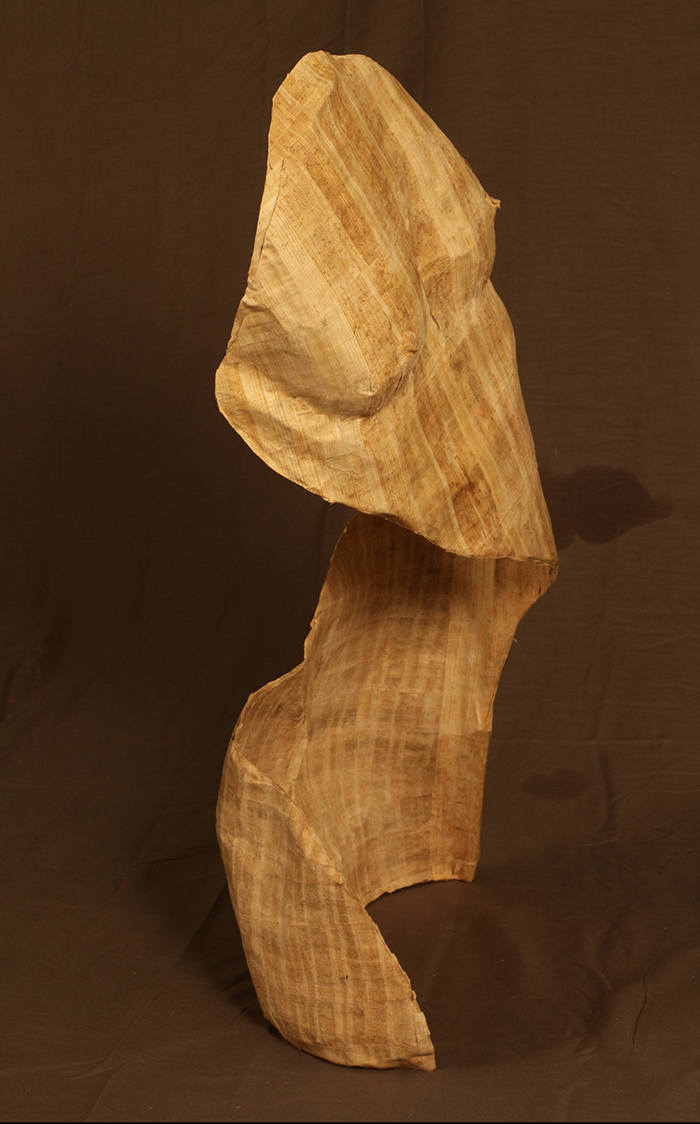
"Man of Papyrus", Papyrus

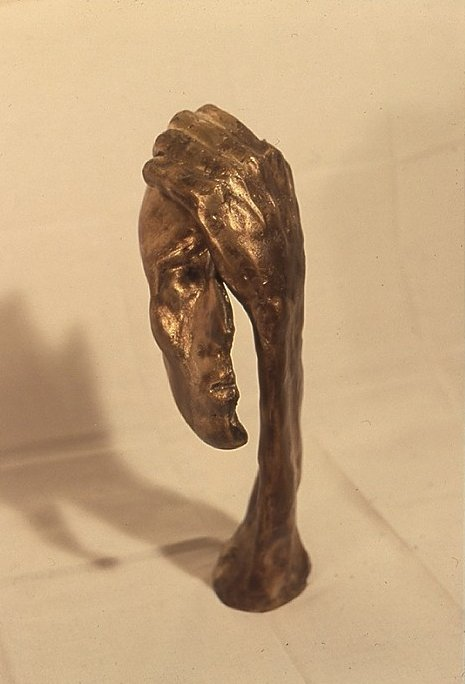
"Holding On", Bronze

== Music ==
Boshelly published his first piano compositions in 2012 as background music for a slideshow of his artwork "Pierce Boshelly Collected Works". His solo piano pieces can be described as jazz infused classical of the romantic or impressionistic period. In 2017, he published his first Trio, a short piece called "Pierce Boshelly Piece No. 52(Trio)" with bassist Nat Smith and vocalist Caroline Smith.
