= Pierres =

There are works that are named Pierres, pronounced like Pierre:

- Pierres (novel), a novel of Victor Hugo
- Pierres (poems), a collection of poems of Roger Caillois

Pierres is the name of several communes in France:

- Pierres, Calvados, in the Calvados département
- Pierres, Eure-et-Loir, in the Eure-et-Loir département

== See also ==
- Pierre (disambiguation)
