= Wholesale funding =

Method of funding commercial banks

Wholesale funding is a method that banks use in addition to core demand deposits to finance operations, make loans, and manage risk. In the United States wholesale funding sources include, but are not limited to, Federal funds, public funds (such as state and local municipalities), U.S. Federal Home Loan Bank advances, the U.S. Federal Reserve's primary credit program, foreign deposits, brokered deposits, and deposits obtained through the Internet or CD listing services.

== Rationale ==
Although core deposits continue to be a key liability funding source, many insured depository institutions have experienced difficulty attracting core deposits and are increasingly looking to wholesale funding sources to satisfy funding and liability management needs.

== Liquidity risk ==
Wholesale funding providers are generally sensitive to changes in the credit risk profile of the institutions to which they provide these funds and to the interest rate environment. For instance, such providers closely track the institution's financial condition and may be likely to curtail such funding if other investment opportunities offer more attractive interest rates. As a result, an institution may experience liquidity problems due to lack of wholesale funding availability when needed. Academic research suggests that the use of wholesale funding was one of the major determinants of bank vulnerability during the 2008 financial crisis.

== See also ==
- Bank
- Interbank lending market
- Funding liquidity
- Wholesale
