= San Pier Maggiore =

San Pier Maggiore may refer to:

- San Pier Maggiore, Pistoia, a former church in Pistoia, Tuscany
- San Pier Maggiore, Florence, a demolished church and former convent in Florence, Tuscany
- Piazza San Pier Maggiore, a square in the centre of Florence, Tuscany
