= Helen C. Peirce School of International Studies =

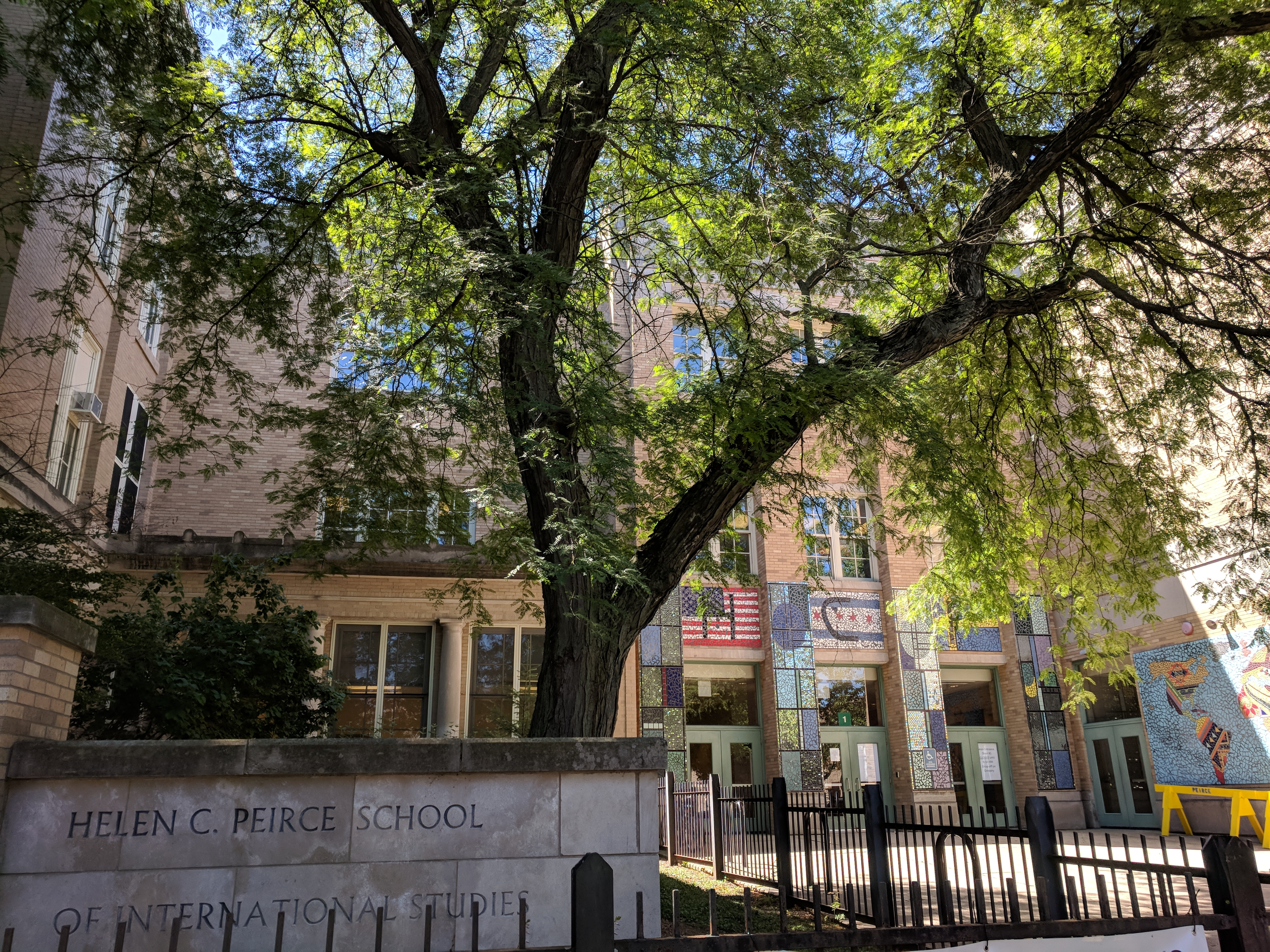
- Façade in 2018

Location
- 1423 West Bryn Mawr Avenue; Chicago, Illinois; United States; 41.9832°N 87.6669°W

Information
- Type: Public elementary
- Established: 1915
- School district: Chicago Public Schools
- Principal: Luis Avila
- Grades: K-8
- Enrollment: N/A
- Website: peirce.cps.edu

Helen C. Peirce School of International Studies first opened its doors in September 1915. The school was named in honor of Helen Caroline Peirce; the founding president of the Lake View Women's Club.

== Campus ==
The school was originally named "Helen C. Peirce" but in 1993, it was selected to participate in the Chicago Board of Education Specialty School Program and was renamed the Helen C. Peirce School of International Studies. Every school year, a different country is studied.

In 1999, a new section was added to the facility. In 2010 Perice officially became a part of the IB (International Baccalaureate) programme MYP (Middle Years Programme 6th-8th grade)
