= Pierse =

Pierse is both a surname and a masculine given name. It is a variant of Pierce, which is of Norman origin. The name appears to be a corruption of the ancient French name Piers, itself derived from the earlier Latin Petrus meaning 'a piece of rock or stone'. The modern French form is Pierre. In connection with the early spelling of name Piers, the terminal s was possibly due to the influence of the French nominative singular ending, giving other examples of this peculiarity such as Jacques and Gilles.

The name was brought to Ireland by the Normans during their settlement after the invasions of 1169 and 1170. When adopted by the Irish, the name underwent a change, for the Irish language softened the plosive Piers down to the fricative Piarais (Pronounced "Fearish").

Notable people with the name include:

== Surname ==
- Annamay Pierse (born 1983), Canadian swimmer
- Catherine Pierse, Irish solicitor
- Peter Pierse (1947–1991), Australian rugby referee
- Toddy Pierse (1898–1968), Irish footballer

== Given ==
- Pierse Loftus (1877–1956), Irish-born British businessman and politician
- Pierse Long (1739–1789), American merchant
- Pierse Joseph Mackesy (1883–1956), Irish-born British Army officer

== See also ==
- Peirse (disambiguation)
- Pearce (surname), a surname of similar origin
