= Peirce (surname) =

Peirce is an English surname. Notable people with this surname include:

- Augustus Baker Peirce (1840–1919) American traveler; riverboat captain and artist in Australia
- Benjamin Peirce (1809–1880), American mathematician, known for Peirce's Criterion, father of Charles
- Charles Sanders Peirce (C. S. Peirce) (1839–1914), American philosopher, founder of pragmatism
- Clarence V. Peirce (1850–1923), American farmer and politician
- Cyrus Peirce (1790–1860), American educator, Unitarian minister
- Ebenezer W. Peirce (1822–1902), American brigadier general (Union) in the Civil War.
- Gareth Peirce (born c. 1940), British solicitor, known for human rights cases
- George James Peirce (1868–1954), American botanist
- Hayford Peirce (1942–2020), American writer of science fiction, mysteries, and spy thrillers
- Jason Peirce (born 1972), American actor
- Joseph Peirce (1748–1812), U.S. Representative from New Hampshire
- Juliette Peirce (died 1934), second wife of the mathematician and philosopher Charles Peirce
- Henry A. Peirce (1808–1885) of Massachusetts. U.S. Minister to Hawaiian Islands
- Kimberly Peirce (born 1967), American film director
- Leslie P. Peirce, American historian
- Lincoln Peirce, American cartoonist known for the comic strip Big Nate
- Robert B. F. Peirce (1843–1898) U.S. Representative from Indiana
- Victor Peirce (1958–2002), Australian criminal from Melbourne
- Waldo Peirce (1884–1970), American painter, born in Bangor, Maine
- Robert Peirce (engineer) (1863–1933), Municipal Water Engineer, Penang and Singapore

== See also ==
- Pierce (surname)
- Peirce (given name)
