= Wilton Center, Illinois =

Wilton Center
- Unincorporated community Census designated place
- Location of Wilton Center within Illinois Wilton Center (the United States)
- Coordinates: 41°21′05″N 87°57′35″W
- Country: United States
- State: Illinois
- County: Will
- Township: Wilton
- Elevation: 663 ft (202 m)

Population (2020)
  - Total: 122
- Time zone: UTC-6 (CST)
  - Summer (DST): UTC-5 (CDT)
- ZIP Code: 60442
- Area code: 815

Wilton Center is an unincorporated community and census designated place (CDP) in southern Will County, Illinois, United States. It is located on flat land 10 miles northeast of Wilmington, 5 miles south of Manhattan, and 8 miles west of Peotone. As of the 2020 census, Wilton Center had a population of 122.

== History ==
=== Indigenous Roots ===
Ce-nag-e-wine (or Senachwine) and Joseph Laughton, the son of a David Laughton and Potawatomi woman, were Potawatomi tribal leaders who, in 1832, were given reservations next to one another along the Forked Creek. This area was referred to as the "Twelve Mile Grove" and would later be known as Wilton Center.

However, these reserves did not last, and in 1836, under the Indian Removal Act, the Potawatomi were forcibly removed to reservations in Kansas. Both leaders sold their land to local settlers in 1840.

=== Origins of Wilton Center ===
While the Grove continued to grow in population, small communities such as Wallingford and Peotone grew popular and formed Wilton Township in 1850.

Wilton Center was officially organized in 1860 at the south end of the Grove and documented two general stores, two wagon shops, two churches, a number of homes, and a school. This school sat on the location of the later built and closed Wilton Center Elementary School. The Center was re-organized in 1876, with many families and structures still present today.

== Geography ==
=== Overview ===
U.S. Route 52 goes through Wilton Center. Other main roads are Cedar Rd., Peotone-Wilmington Rd., and Elevator Rd. Other roads in Wilton Center are Arsenal Rd. and Quigley Rd. Wilton Center is half surrounded by a forest preserve controlled by Will County. There is a church on Rt. 52.

=== Laughton Preserve ===
The Laughton Preserve is a 430-acre nature and wildlife preserve that sits within and around Wilton Center. The preserve holds cultural importance as well as natural, maintaining portions of the 1832 Ce-nag-e-wine and Joseph Laughton Reservations, and the historic Wallingford Settlement. The Civilian Conservation Corps was tasked with building a picnic shelter in the 1930s that still stands today.

The preserve is the natural habitat for Big Brown Bats and is part of the Forked Creek preservation system, which conserves more than 2,400 acres.

== Education ==
Wilton Center is a part of Peotone School District 207-U. Wilton Center Elementary School was closed, after a November 2013 vote by the board of trustees, resulting in a 4–3 outcome. The closure was effective upon the completion of the 2013–2014 school year.

== Demographics ==
Historical population
Census	Pop.	Note	%±
2020	122		—
U.S. Decennial Census

Wilton Center first appeared as a census designated place in the 2020 U.S. census.

=== 2020 census ===
Wilton Center CDP, Illinois – Racial and ethnic composition Note: the US Census treats Hispanic/Latino as an ethnic category. This table excludes Latinos from the racial categories and assigns them to a separate category. Hispanics/Latinos may be of any race.
Race / Ethnicity (NH = Non-Hispanic)	Pop 2020	% 2020
White alone (NH)	108	88.52%
Black or African American alone (NH)	1	0.82%
Native American or Alaska Native alone (NH)	0	0.00%
Asian alone (NH)	0	0.00%
Native Hawaiian or Pacific Islander alone (NH)	0	0.00%
Other race alone (NH)	0	0.00%
Mixed race or Multiracial (NH)	0	0.00%
Hispanic or Latino (any race)	13	10.66%
Total	122	100.00%

== Notable people ==
- Richard J. Barr, Illinois State Senator, was born in Wilton Center.
