= Pearce (surname) =

Pearce is a surname, from knights of the Norman lord Mansfield prior to the invasion of England. It derives etymologically from the Germanic word to pierce, and was a name commonly given to warrior caste in Saxon/Jute, p-Celtic and oil languages. Another etymology is from Piers, the medieval vernacular form of Peter, and may refer to:

== People ==
- Adam Pearce (born 1978), American professional wrestler
- Adam Pearce (soccer) (born 1997), Australian soccer player
- Adrienne Pearce, South African actress
- AJ Pearce (born 1964), English author
- Al Pearce (1898–1961), American singer
- Alan Pearce (born 1965), English footballer
- Alanah Pearce (born 1993), Australian video game writer and journalist
- Albert Pearce (fl. 2010s), American politician from Vermont
- Alec Pearce (1910–1982), English cricketer
- Alex Pearce (footballer, born 1988) (born 1988), Footballer
- Alex Pearce (Australian footballer) (born 1995), Australian rules footballer
- Alexander Pearce (1790–1824), Irish convicted criminal and confessed cannibal
- Alice Pearce (1917–1966), American actress
- Allan Pearce (born 1983), New Zealand footballer and physiotherapist
- Andrew Pearce (politician) (1937–2015), British politician
- Andrew Pearce (diplomat), Governor of Montserrat from 2018 to 2022
- Andy Pearce (born 1966), English footballer
- Arthur Pearce (1881–1902), Australian rules footballer
- Arthur Ernest Pearce (1859–1934), English sculptor and ceramic artist
- Arthur Fairchild Pearce (1903–1990), New Zealand jazz musician
- Ashlyn Pearce (born 1994), American actress
- Austin Pearce (1921–2004), British businessman
- Barcley Pearce (born 1970), Canadian ice hockey player
- Beth Pearce, Vermont government official
- Bill Pearce (1926–2010), American singer and trombonist
- Billy Pearce, English actor and comedian
- Bob Pearce (born 1946), Australian politician
- Bobby Pearce (rower) (1905–1976), Australian-Canadian sculler
- Bobby Pearce (designer) (born 1961), American costume designer
- Brad Pearce (tennis) (born 1966), American tennis player
- Brad Pearce (footballer) (born 1971), Australian rules footballer
- Brian Pearce (1915–2008), British politician, historian, and translator
- Bryan Pearce (1929–2007), British painter
- Bunny Pearce (1885–1933), American baseball player
- Caroline Pearce (born 1981), English athlete
- Carly Pearce (born 1990), American country music singer
- Charles Pearce (disambiguation), various including:
- Christopher or Chris Pearce (disambiguation)
- Clancee Pearce (born 1990), Australian rules footballer
- Cliff Pearce, Australian rugby league footballer
- Col Pearce (1917–2004), Australian rugby league referee
- Colby Pearce (born 1972), American cyclist
- Col Pearce (1917–2004), Australian rugby league referee
- Colman Pearce (born 1938), Irish pianist and conductor
- Craig Pearce, Australian actor and writer
- Cromwell Pearce (1772–1852), U.S. Army colonel during the War of 1812
- Daniel Pearce (born 1978), English musician
- Danyle Pearce (born 1986), Australian rules footballer
- Darryl Pearce (1960–2025), Australian basketball player
- David Pearce (disambiguation)
- Deb Pearce, Canadian broadcaster and comedian
- Denis Pearce (1896–1968), British fencer
- Dennis Pearce (born 1974), English footballer
- Dickey Pearce (1836–1908), early baseball player who started with the Brooklyn Atlantics in 1856
- Donn Pearce (1928–2017), American author of Cool Hand Luke
- Douglas Pearce (born 1956), English folk musician Douglas P.
- Drew Pearce (born 1975), English writer, producer and director
- Drue Pearce (born 1951), American businesswoman and politician
- Dutee Jerauld Pearce (1789–1849), American politician
- Eddie Pearce (born 1952), American golfer
- Edgar Pearce (born 1937/38), British criminal convicted of the Mardi Gras bombings
- Edmund Pearce (1870–1935), English bishop
- Edward Pearce (disambiguation)
- Eric Pearce (disambiguation)
- Ernest Pearce (1865–1930), English bishop
- Eve Pearce (1929–2023), Scottish actress
- Francis Tring Pearce (1846–1935), English director of Priday, Metford and Company Limited
- Frank Pearce (disambiguation)
- Fred Pearce (born 1951), English journalist
- Gary Pearce (disambiguation)
- George Pearce (disambiguation)
- Gordon Pearce (born 1934), Indian-born Australian hockey player
- Graham Pearce (English footballer) (born 1959), English footballer
- Greg Pearce (disambiguation)
- Guy Pearce (born 1967), Australian actor
- Heath Pearce (born 1984), American soccer player
- Hen Pearce (1777–1809), English prizefighter
- Henry Pearce (disambiguation)
- Howard Pearce (born 1949), English-born Governor of the Falkland Islands
- Ian Pearce (born 1974), English footballer
- Irene Pearce (1900–2012), British supercentenarian
- Ivy May Pearce (1914–1998), Australian pilot and business owner
- Jackson Pearce (born 1984), American author
- Jacqueline Pearce (1943–2018), British actress
- Jacqueline Pearce (author) (born 1962), Canadian author
- James Oliver-Pearce (born 1991), English football coach
- James Pearce (1805–1862), American politician
- James Pearce Jr. (born 2003), American football player
- Jason Pearce (born 1987), English footballer
- Jeff Pearce (American musician) (born 1967), American ambient guitarist
- Jeff Pearce (Canadian musician) (born 1967), Canadian musician
- Jim Pearce (disambiguation)
- Jimmy Pearce (born 1947), English footballer
- Joe Pearce (Australian rugby league) (1910–1995), Australian rugby league footballer
- Joe Pearce (footballer) (1885–1915), Australian rules footballer
- Joe Pearce (British rugby league), rugby league footballer of the 1920s and 1930s
- John Pearce (disambiguation)
- Jonathan Pearce (disambiguation)
- Jordan Pearce (born 1986), American ice hockey player
- Joseph Pearce (disambiguation)
- Josh Pearce (born 1977), American baseball player
- Joshua Pearce, (living) American scientist and engineer
- Julian Pearce (field hockey) (born 1937), Australian field hockey player
- Kevin Pearce (disambiguation)
- Krystian Pearce (born 1990), English footballer
- Lara Taylor-Pearce, Sierra Leonean auditor general
- Laurence Pearce (born 1990), English rugby league and union player
- Lawrence Pearce (born 1980), English film writer and director
- Lennard Pearce (1915–1984), British actor
- Leslie Pearce (disambiguation)
- Lindsay Pearce, American actress and singer
- Mahal Pearce (born 1977), New Zealand golfer
- Mark Pearce (disambiguation)
- Mark Guy Pearse (1842–1930), British preacher, lecturer and author
- Martin Pearce (born 1983), English cricketer
- Mary Vivian Pearce (born 1947), American actress
- Michael Pearce (author) (1933–2022), Anglo-Egyptian Sudan author
- Michael Pearce (artist) (born 1965), British, California based artist
- Mitchell Pearce (born 1989), Australian rugby league player
- Monty J. Pearce (born 1948), member of the Idaho senate
- Nancy Pearcey (born 1952), American Christian author
- Nathaniel Pearce (1779–1820), British explorer
- Nathan Pearce (1977), husband, father, and baker at Gluten Free Galley in Raleigh, NC
- Nicholas Bartlett Pearce, American Civil War general in the Union Army
- Ollie Pearce (born 1995), English footballer
- Pard Pearce (1896–1974), American football player
- Paul Pearce (born 1956), Australian politician
- Perce Pearce (1900–1955), American producer, director, and writer
- Pevita Pearce (born 1992), Indonesian actress and model
- Philippa Pearce (1920–2006), English writer for children
- Pippa Pearce, Conservator
- Reylene Pearce, Australian actress
- Richard Pearce (disambiguation)
- Robert Pearce (disambiguation)
- Rudolph Pearce (born 1945), Jamaican footballer
- Russell Pearce (1947–2023), American politician
- Ruth Pearce Australian ambassador
- Sam Pearce (born 1997), Welsh cricketer
- Sandy Pearce (1883–1930), Australian rugby league footballer and boxer
- Sarah Pearce (born 1965), British professor of history
- Shaun Pearce (born 1969), British canoeist
- Shirley Pearce (born 1954), English psychologist
- Stanley Pearce (1863–1929), English cricketer
- Stephen Pearce (1819–1904), English painter
- Steve Pearce (disambiguation)
- Stevo Pearce (born 1962), British record label owner
- Stuart Pearce (born 1962), English football coach
- Suzie Muirhead (born 1975), New Zealand field hockey player known as Suzie Pearce until she married
- Sydney Pearce (1883–1930), Australian rugby league player
- Teresa Pearce (born 1955), British politician
- Terry Pearce (disambiguation)
- Thomas Pearce (disambiguation)
- Tom Pearce (cricketer) (1905–1994), English cricketer and rugby union official
- Tom Pearce (footballer)
- Vera Pearce (1895–1966), Australian actress
- Virginia H. Pearce (born 1945), author and member of Young Women organization of The Church of Jesus Christ of Latter-day Saints
- Walter Pearce (disambiguation)
- Wayne Pearce (born 1960), Australian captain of the Rugby League Club Balmain Tigers from 1982 to 1990
- William Pearce (disambiguation)
- Zachary Pearce (1690–1774), English bishop

== Fictional characters ==
- Aiden Pearce, from the video game Watch Dogs
- Harry Pearce, from the British television series Spooks
- Lola Pearce, from the British soap opera EastEnders
- Melissa Pearce, from the Japanese novel Parasite Eve
- Mickey Pearce, from the British sitcom Only Fools and Horses
- Phil Pearce, from the British soap opera Emmerdale Farm
- Ruth Pearce, from the British soap opera Doctors

== See also ==
- Justice Pearce (disambiguation)
- Pearse (surname)
- Peirce (surname)
- Pierce (surname)
- Pearce (given name)
