= Pierce (surname) =

Pierce is an English, Welsh, and Irish surname. The name is a cognate of French Pierre ('Peter'). Notable people with that surname include:

== Disambiguation pages ==
- Andrew Pierce (disambiguation), several people
- Benjamin Pierce (disambiguation), several people
- Bill Pierce (disambiguation), several people
- Bobby Pierce (disambiguation), several people
- Charles Pierce (disambiguation), several people
- David Pierce (disambiguation), several people
- Edward Pierce (disambiguation), several people
- Franklin Pierce (disambiguation), several people
- George Pierce (disambiguation), several people
- Jack Pierce (disambiguation), several people
- John Pierce (disambiguation), several people
- James Pierce (disambiguation), several people
- Larry Pierce (disambiguation), several people
- Richard Pierce (disambiguation), several people
- William Pierce (disambiguation), several people

== Arts and letters ==
- Aida Pierce (born 1956), Mexican actress and comedian
- Bradley Pierce (born 1982), American voice-over artist and character actor
- Chonda Pierce (born 1960), American Christian comedian often billed as "The Queen of Clean"
- Gareth Pierce, Welsh actor
- Jason Pierce (born 1965), English musician
- Jeffrey Lee Pierce (1958–1996), American singer, songwriter, and guitarist
- Jeffrey Pierce (born 1971), American actor, film director, and producer
- Jo Carol Pierce (1944–2022), American songwriter, singer, playwright, and screenwriter
- Judith Pierce (1930–2003), English operatic soprano
- Justin Pierce (1975–2000), English-American actor and professional skateboarder
- Marjorie Pierce (1900–1999), American architect
- Marvin Pierce (1893–1969), American publisher, president of McCall Corporation
- Nat Pierce (1925–1992), American jazz pianist and arranger
- Nicola Pierce (born 1969), Irish writer and ghostwriter
- Nora Pierce, American author and academic
- Ponchitta Pierce (born 1942), television host and producer
- Tamora Pierce (born 1954), American fantasy fiction author
- Tedd Pierce (Edward Stacey Pierce III; 1906–1972), American animated cartoon writer, animator and artist
- The Pierces: Allison and Catherine, American alternative band
- Tim Pierce (born 1959), American session guitarist
- Webb Pierce (1921–1991), American country music singer
- Wendell Pierce (born 1962), American actor

== Politics, law, and government ==
- Abe E. Pierce, III (1934–2021), African-American educator and mayor of Monroe, Louisiana
- Barbara Bush (née Pierce, 1925–2018), First Lady of the United States 1989–1993
- Franklin Pierce (1804–1869), the 14th president of the United States
- Gary Pierce (born c. 1952), American politician, and Arizona Corporation Commissioner
- Gilbert A. Pierce (1839–1901), author, journalist, playwright, member of the Indiana state legislature, eighth Governor of Dakota Territory, and representative for North Dakota in the U.S. Senate
- Henry L. Pierce (1825–1896), U.S. Representative from Massachusetts
- James F. Pierce (1830–1905), New York politician
- Jane Pierce (1806–1863), wife of U.S. president Franklin Pierce
- Joshua C. Pierce (1830–1904), American politician and businessman
- Julian Pierce (?–1988), Lumbee Indian, chemist, lawyer, murdered at start of campaign to win electoral primary for position of superior court judge for Robeson, North Carolina
- Lawrence W. Pierce (1924-2020) African American Federal Judge
- Lewis W. Pierce (1810–1882), American politician
- Maris Bryant Pierce (1811–1874), Seneca chief, lawyer, land-rights activist
- Ray V. Pierce (1840–1914), U.S. Representative from New York State
- Samuel Pierce (1922–2000), United States Secretary of Housing and Urban Development 1981–1989
- Walter M. Pierce (1861–1954), Governor of Oregon and a member of the U.S. House of Representatives

== Sciences ==
- Benjamin C. Pierce, professor of computer science at the University of Pennsylvania known for two books on type theory
- G. W. Pierce (George Washington Pierce; 1872–1956), Harvard professor of physics and inventor in the development of electronic telecommunications
- W. Dwight Pierce (1881–1967), American entomologist

== Sports ==
- Aaron Pierce (American football) (born 1969), former professional American football player
- Alec Pierce (born 2000), American football player
- Anna Pierce (née Willard, born 1984), American middle-distance runner
- Artavis Pierce (born 1996), American football player
- Barry Pierce (1934–2020), English professional footballer
- Bemus Pierce (1873–1957), American football player and college sports coach
- Bernard Pierce (born 1990), American football player
- Billy Pierce (1927–2015), American professional baseball player
- Brent Pierce (born 1969), Canadian curler
- Buck Pierce (born 1981), retired American football player, now a coach
- Caroline Pierce (born 1963), English golfer
- Charlie Pierce (born 1953), American sportswriter
- Dameon Pierce (born 2000), American football player
- Daniel Pierce (born 2006), American baseball player
- Don Pierce (jockey) (born 1937), American jockey
- Gary Pierce (1951–2025), English football player
- Greg Pierce (1950–2016), Australian rugby league footballer, coach and administrator
- Harry Pierce (1913–1975), Australian rugby league footballer
- Hollin Pierce (born 2001), American football player
- J. A. Pierce (1874–1956), American football coach
- James Pierce (1900–1983), American football player, coach, and actor
- James Pierce (curler) (born 1963), American Paralympian
- Mary Pierce (born 1975), French-American retired tennis player
- Michael Pierce (cricketer) (1869–1913), Australian cricketer
- Mike Pierce (born 1980), American mixed martial artist
- Paul Pierce (born 1977), American professional basketball player
- Payton Pierce (born 2004), American football player
- Pierre Pierce (born 1983), American professional basketball player
- Ricky Pierce (born 1959), American retired basketball player
- Robbie Pierce (1959–2023), American off-road racer and businessman
- Rusty Pierce (born 1979), American former soccer player
- Ryan Pierce (soccer) (born 1983), American soccer player
- Shanghai Pierce, an early ring name of American professional wrestler Mark Canterbury (born 1964), better known as Henry O. Godwinn
- Trey Pierce (born 2004), American football player

== Other ==
- Byron Root Pierce (1829–1924), American dentist
- Francis Junior Pierce (1924–1986), U.S. Navy Corpsman who received the Medal of Honor for actions in the Battle of Iwo Jima during World War II
- Gus Pierce, alternative name for Augustus Baker Peirce (1840–1919); American traveler, riverboat captain and artist in Australia
- Guy Hollis Pierce (1934–2014), member of the Governing Body of Jehovah's Witnesses
- James Pieronnet Pierce (c. 1825 – 1897), California entrepreneur
- Lovick Pierce, American pastor, Chaplain in the War of 1812
- Sarah Pierce (1767–1852), American educator

== Fictional characters ==
- Aaron Pierce (24 character), supporting character in American TV series 24
- Alexander Pierce, a Marvel Comics character
- Annette Pierce, cafe owner in Japanese manga Black Cat
- Anissa Pierce (Thunder), a DC Comics superhero
- Brittany Pierce, character in American television series Glee
- Donald Pierce, Marvel Comics supervillain
- Griffin Pierce-Taylor, character in Canadian TV series Degrassi: The Next Generation
- Gwendolyn Pierce, a character in the American sitcom television series Charles in Charge
- Hawkeye Pierce, main character in American book, film and television franchise M*A*S*H
- Jefferson Pierce (Black Lightning), a DC Comics superhero
  - Jefferson Pierce (Arrowverse), the Arrowverse version of the character
- Jennifer Pierce (Lightning), a DC Comics superhero
- Katherine Pierce, antagonist in American TV series The Vampire Diaries
- Mildred Pierce, title character in the 1941 James M. Cain novel of the same title adapted into two films:
  - Mildred Pierce (film), a 1945 film
  - Mildred Pierce (TV series), a 2011 miniseries
- Nica Pierce, a protagonist in the Child's Play movie franchise
- Ryan Pierce, character in American TV series The West Wing, see List of The West Wing characters
- Zazel Pierce, one of the main characters in Quackser Fortune Has a Cousin in the Bronx

== See also ==
- Jan Peerce (1904–1984), American operatic tenor born in New York City
- Pearce (surname)
- Peirce (surname)
- Pierce (given name)
- Pierse, surname and given name
