= Robert Peirce =

Robert Peirce may refer to:

- Robert B. F. Peirce (1843–1898), U.S. Representative from Indiana
- Robert Peirce (engineer) (1863–1933), British-born civil engineer in Malaysia and Singapore
- Bob Peirce (born 1955), British businessman and diplomat
- Robert Peirce III (born 1970), attorney at Robert Peirce and Associates

== See also ==
- Robert Pierce (disambiguation)
- Robert Pearce (disambiguation)
