= Peerce =

Peerce is a surname. Notable people with the surname include:

- Jan Peerce (1904–1984), American opera singer
- Larry Peerce (born 1930), American film and television director

== See also ==
- Pearce (surname)
- Pierce (surname)
