= Frank Pearce =

Frank Pearce may refer to:

- Frank Pearce (footballer) (1904–1969), Australian rules footballer
- Frank Pearce (businessman), American video game executive
- Frank Pearce (cricketer) (1869-1933), Jamaican cricketer
- Frank Pearce (1870s pitcher) (1860–1926), American baseball pitcher for the 1876 Louisville Grays
- Frank Pearce (1930s pitcher) (1905–1950), American baseball pitcher for the 1933–35 Philadelphia Phillies
- Frank Pearce, tennis player in 1905 Wimbledon Championships – Men's Singles

== See also ==
- Franklin Pearce (disambiguation)
- Frank Pierce (athlete) (1883–1908), American track and field athlete
