= William Pierce =

William Pierce may refer to:

== Politics ==
- William Pierce (Georgia politician) (1753–1789), Continental Congressman from Georgia
- William Pierce (Illinois politician), Illinois state representative
- William Luther Pierce (1933–2002), white nationalist and political activist
- Bud Pierce (William C. Pierce, born 1956), politician in Oregon

== Sports ==
- Billy Pierce (Walter William Pierce, 1927–2015), American baseball player
- Bill Pierce (baseball) (William Herbert Pierce, 1890–1962), Negro leagues baseball player and manager

== Other ==
- William Pierce (serial killer) (1931–2020), American serial killer also known as "Junior"
- William Henry Pierce (missionary) (1856–1948), Canadian missionary for the Methodist church
- William H. Pierce (1859–1939), American mortuarist
- William S. Pierce (born 1937), American surgeon and chemical engineer
- William Pierce (robber), perpetrator of the Great Gold Robbery

== See also ==
- Bill Pierce (disambiguation)
- Pierce (surname)
- William Pearce (disambiguation)
- William Peirce (disambiguation)
