= Robert Pierce (disambiguation) =

Robert Pierce is founder of the charity World Vision.

Robert Pierce may also refer to:

- Robert Pierce (physician) (1622–1710), English physician
- Robert W. Pierce (1821–1914), Wisconsin state assemblyman
- Robert L. Pierce (1901–1968), Chairman of the Republican Party of Wisconsin
- Rob Pierce (fl. 2010s), musician with the Dead Rabbits
- Bob Pierce (born 1960), American former professional basketball coach who was head coach for USC
- Bob Pierce (hurdler) (born 1941), American hurdler, 1961 NCAA runner-up for the USC Trojans track and field team

== See also ==
- Bob Peirce (born 1955), British-American diplomat
- Bobby Pierce (disambiguation)
- Robert Peirce (disambiguation)
- Robert Pearce (disambiguation)
