= Christopher Pierce =

Christopher Pierce may refer to:

- Chris Pierce, American musician
- Christopher Pierce (rower) (born 1942), British rower

== See also ==
- Christopher Pearce (disambiguation)
