= Steven Pierce (disambiguation) =

Steven Pierce (born 1949) is an American politician in Massachusetts.

Steven Pierce may also refer to:

- Steve Pierce (born 1950), American politician from Arizona
- Steve Pierce (American football) (born 1963), American football wide receiver
- Stephen Rowland Pierce (1896–1966), architect and town planning consultant

== See also ==
- Steve Pearce (disambiguation)
- Steve Piearce (born 1974), English footballer
- Stephen Pears (born 1962), English footballer
