= Franklin Pearce =

Franklin Pearce may refer to:

- Franklin Pearce (1930s pitcher) (1905–1950)
- Franklin Pearce (1870s pitcher) (1860–1926)

== See also ==
- Franklin Pierce (disambiguation)
- Frank Pearce (disambiguation)
