= Isaac Fuller =

English painter

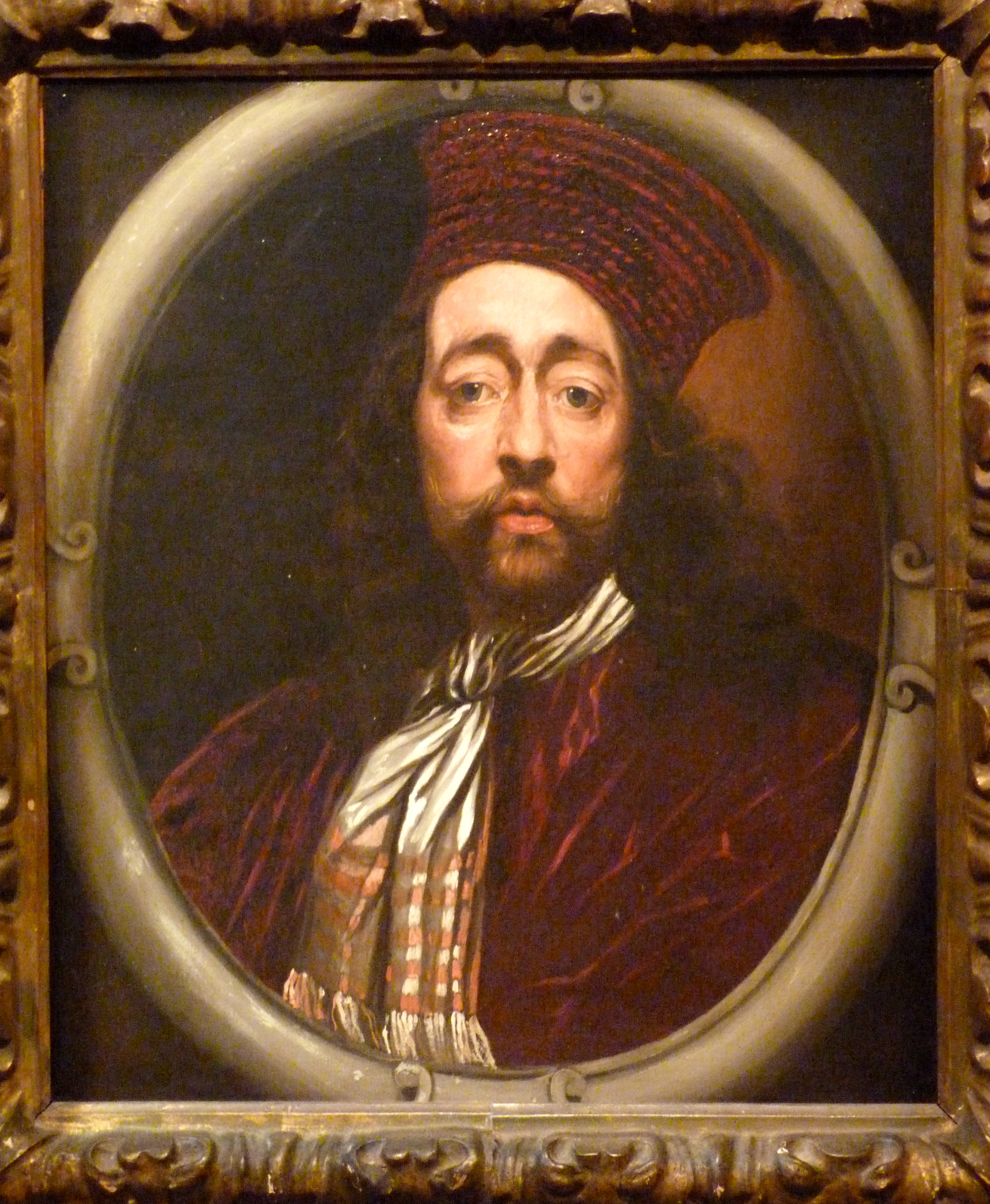
Self-portrait, around 1670

Isaac Fuller (1606 (?) – 1672) was an English painter. Trained in France, he worked in Oxford and London. His works included portraits, religious subjects and decorative paintings.

== Early life and education ==
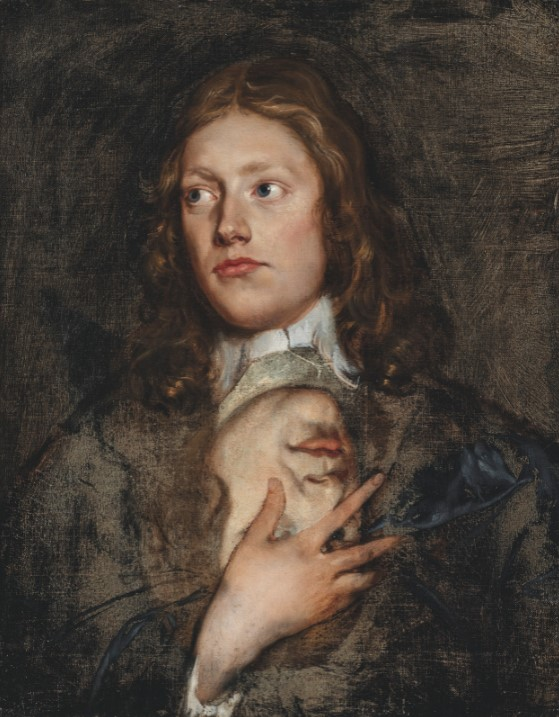
Portrait of a gentleman, bust-length, with a further portrait beneath, Oil on canvas, 17th century, 46,6 × 36,8 cm, Private collection, Paris

Fuller is often said to have been born in 1606, but may have been born as late as 1620. According to Bainbrigg Buckeridge, writing at the beginning of the 17th century, he studied under the French Baroque painter François Perrier in Paris.

== Work in Oxford ==
During the earlier part of the 1660s Fuller decorated the chapels of Magdalen and All Souls Colleges at Oxford. His work at Magdalen representing the Resurrection is lost, but a print survives, showing a complex and ambitious composition derived ultimately from Michelangelo. At All Souls he painted a fresco of The Last Judgement, which is also lost, although some additional panels by Fuller, originally fitted between the roof-trusses in the chancel, survive. John Evelyn said that the fresco would not last long, being "too full of nakeds". He also painted an altarpiece for the chapel at Wadham College, using an unusual technique in which the image was drawn on grey cloth in brown and white crayons, and then ironed into the fabric. Joseph Addison wrote a poem in praise of it.

== Decorative painting ==
In London Fuller did a lot of work as decorative painter, especially in taverns. These included the Sun near the Royal Exchange, and the Mitre in Fenchurch Street, where he decorated the walls of a large room with life-sized mythological figures, and the ceiling with two angels holding a mitre. He also painted the ceiling over the staircase in a house in Soho Square, and a ceiling at Painter-Stainers' Hall.

== Portraiture ==
While at Oxford he painted portraits, and also copied William Dobson's Decollation of St. John, altering the heads to portraits of his own friends. As a portrait painter Fuller had some real power, and self-portrait, in the Bodleian Library at Oxford, shows him in a curious head-dress. John Elsum wrote an epigram on it. There is a related drawing by Fuller in the collection of the Victoria and Albert Museum, probably the preparatory work for a print. There is a portrait of Fuller, drawn by George Vertue, in the collection of the British Museum.

Other portraits painted by Fuller were of Samuel Butler, Edward Pierce the carver, and John Ogilby, the author (these two were in the Strawberry Hill Collection, and the latter was engraved by William Camden Edwards), Norris, the king's frame-maker (a picture much praised by Sir Peter Lely), John Cleveland, Sir Kenelm Digby, and Jasper Latham, the sculptor.

Horace Walpole wrote that "in his historic compositions Fuller is a wretched painter: his colouring was raw and unnatural, and not compensated by disposition or invention", but praised his portraits, in which "his pencil was bold strong and masterly".

== Escape of Charles II after the Battle of Worcester ==
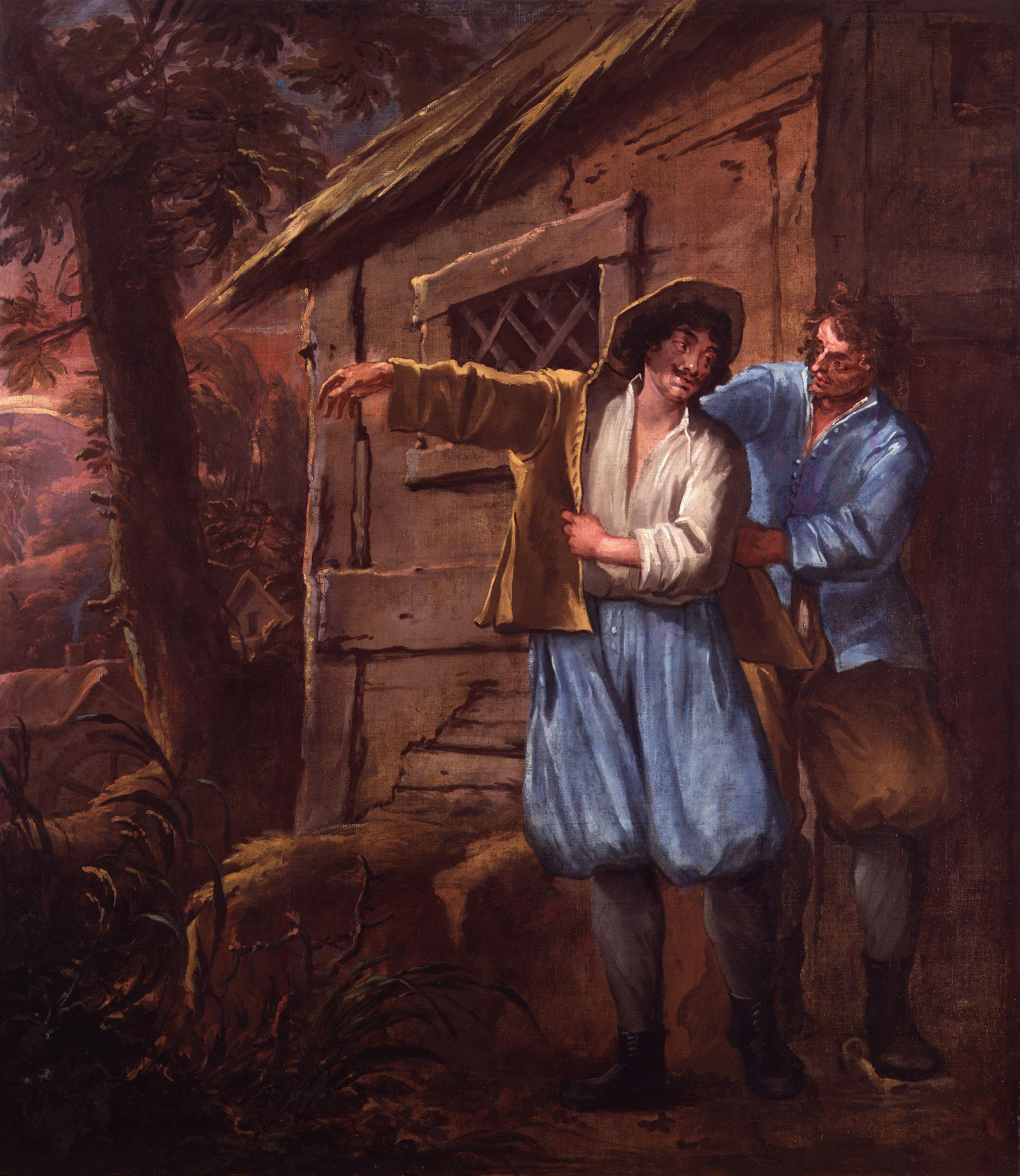
King Charles II in Boscobel Wood, second of the series showing the escape of Charles II after Worcester

Fuller painted five large pictures on wood, representing the escape of Charles II after the Battle of Worcester. Each painting is 7 feet (2.1 m) high; they range in width between 6 ft. and 10 feet 6 inches (3.20 m) wide. The circumstances of their commissioning is undocumented, but they were sold in February 1743/4 with a collection of pictures said to have belonged to Rachel Carey, Viscountess Falkland, and may have been painted for her first husband, Henry Carey, 4th Viscount Falkland, who was elected MP for Oxford following the death of Richard Cromwell, and was in the party which escorted Charles II back to England before his coronation. If this is so, they would date from before Carey's death in April 1663.

The paintings were presented to the Parliament of Ireland and subsequently discovered in a state of neglect by Lord Clanbrassil, who had them repaired, and moved them to Tullamore Park, County Down. They were purchased by the National Portrait Gallery in London in 1979.

== Etchings ==
Fuller made some etchings, including some plates of Tritons and mythological subjects in the style of François Perrier. In 1654 he published a set of etchings entitled Un libro di designare. In Thomas Fuller's Pisgah-sight of Palestine there is a large folding plate of Jewish costumes, etched by Isaac Fuller. He may also have executed the plan of Jerusalem in the same book, on which the words Fuller's Field are written in English.

== Death ==
Fuller died in Bloomsbury Square, London, on 17 July 1672.

== Isaac Fuller the Younger ==
He left a son, who, according to George Vertue worked mostly as a coach-painter. With Henry Cooke and others he executed the etchings in the edition of Cæsar Ripa's Iconologia published by Pierce Tempest.

== Sources ==
- Solkin, David H. (1999). "Isaac Fuller's Escape of Charles II: A Restoration Tragicomedy". Journal of the Warburg and Courtauld Institutes. 62: 199–240. doi:10.2307/751387. JSTOR 751387.

Attribution

This article incorporates text from a publication now in the public domain: "Fuller, Isaac". Dictionary of National Biography. London: Smith, Elder & Co. 1885–1900.
