= Andrew Pearce =

Andrew Pearce may refer to:

- Andrew Pearce (politician) (born 1937), British politician
- Andrew Pearce (diplomat) (born 1960), British diplomat and governor of Montserrat
- Andy Pearce (born 1966), English footballer
- Andrew Pearce (born 1966), Australian amateur astronomer, namesake of minor planet Andrewpearce

== See also ==
- Andrew Pierce (disambiguation)
