= James Pearce =

James, Jim or Jimmy Pearce may refer to:

== Politics ==
- James Pearce (American politician) (1805–1862), American senator from Maryland
- James Pearce (South Australian politician) (1825–1904), House of Assembly and Legislative Council member
- Jim Pearce (politician) (born 1948), Australian Labor member of Queensland Legislative Assembly

== Sports ==
- James Pearce (tackle) (fl. 1903–1922), American football tackle
- Jim Pearce (footballer) (1909–1986), Welsh footballer
- Jim Pearce (baseball) (1925–2005), American baseball player
- Jimmy Pearce (born 1947), English footballer
- James Pearce Jr. (born 2003), American football defensive end

== Others ==
- James Alfred Pearce (judge) (1840–1920), American jurist on Maryland Court of Appeals
- James Pearce (journalist), British presenter for BBC Sport since 2003

== See also ==
- James Pierce (disambiguation)
- James Peirce (c. 1674–1726), English dissenting minister
