= Bobby Pierce =

Bobby Pierce may refer to:

- Bobby Pierce (baseball coach, born 1959), American college baseball coach
- Bobby Pierce (baseball coach, born 1978), American college baseball coach
- Bobby Pierce (politician), American politician from Arkansas
- Bobby Pierce (racing driver) (born 1996), American dirt race car driver

== See also ==
- Robert Pierce (disambiguation)
- Bobby Pearce (disambiguation)
- Pierce (surname)
