= Justice Pierce =

Justice Pierce may refer to:

- Edward Pierce (Massachusetts judge) (1852–1938), associate justice of the Massachusetts Supreme Judicial Court
- Randy G. Pierce (fl. 1980s–2010s), associate justice of the Supreme Court of Mississippi

== See also ==
- Judge Pierce (disambiguation)
- Justice Pearce (disambiguation)
