= Joe Pearce =

Joe Pearce may refer to:

- Joe Pearce (Australian rugby league) (1910–1995), Australian rugby league player
- Joe Pearce (British rugby league) (fl. 1925–c. 1933), British rugby league player
- Joe Pearce (footballer) (1885–1915), Australian rules footballer

== See also ==
- Joseph Pearce (disambiguation)
