= Richard Bennett Carmichael =

American politician

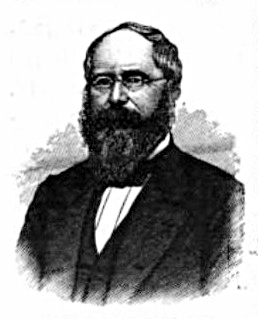
Richard Bennett Carmichael

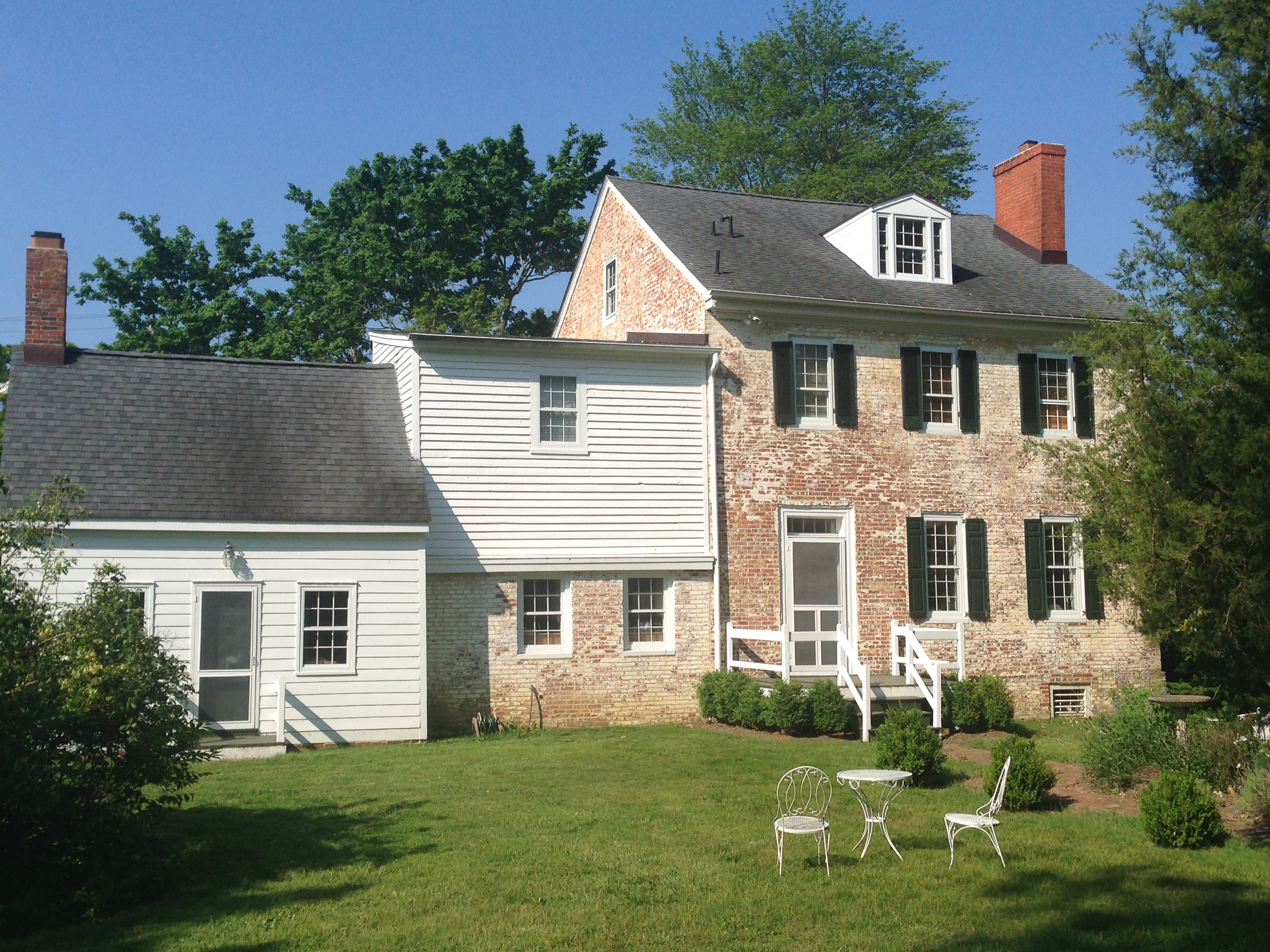
Birthplace of Richard Bennett Carmichael in Centreville, Maryland (the William Carmichael House, c. 1804)

Richard Bennett Carmichael (December 25, 1807 – October 21, 1884) was an American politician from Maryland.

Born in Centreville, Maryland, Carmichael attended the academy at Centreville and Dickinson College of Carlisle, Pennsylvania, and graduated from Princeton College in 1828. He studied law, was admitted to the bar in 1830, and commenced practice in Centreville.

Carmichael served as a member of the Maryland House of Delegates in 1831 and again from 1841–1866. He was elected as a Jacksonian to the Twenty-third Congress and served from March 4, 1833 to March 4, 1835. He resumed the practice of law afterwards.

Carmichael was a delegate to the Democratic National Conventions in 1856, 1864, 1868, and 1876, judge of the circuit court from 1858 to 1864, and presiding judge of the county court of Queen Anne's County, Maryland in 1861. He served as a member and president of the State constitutional convention in 1867. He died at "Wye" near Carmichael, Maryland, and is interred in the family burying ground at "Wye".

Richard Carmichael was the grandnephew of William Carmichael.

== Controversy ==
During the American Civil War, Judge Richard Bennett Carmichael was a presiding circuit court judge for Kent, Queen Anne, Caroline, and Talbot counties. In November 1861, federal officials arrested three men charged with interfering with the election process after they heckled Unionists at a rally. Opposed to the arbitrary arrests and abuse of civil liberties, Carmichael instructed grand juries to indict the persons who made or abetted such arrests. As a result, Secretary of State William Seward ordered Judge Carmichael's arrest. On May 27, 1862, Union Army General John Adams Dix in turn, issued orders for the arrest of Judge Carmichael, now suspected of being a southern sympathizer. More than 125 deputies and soldiers surrounded the courthouse, two then entered the courtroom and seized Carmichael. A man named John L. Bishop beat Carmichael over the head with his pistol until the judge was unconscious. Carmichael was dragged out of the courtroom and taken by steamer to Fort McHenry. Six months later he was released without ever being charged or tried for any crime.

U.S. House of Representatives
Preceded by Benedict Joseph Semmes	Member of the U.S. House of Representatives from Maryland's 2nd congressional district 1833–1835	Succeeded by James Alfred Pearce
