= George Peirce =

George Peirce may refer to:

- George James Peirce (1868–1954), American botanist
- George W. Peirce (1846–1938), American businessman

== See also ==
- George Pierce (disambiguation)
- George Pearce (disambiguation)
- George Pearse (disambiguation)
