= Thomas Pearce =

Thomas or Tom Pearce may refer to:

- Thomas Pearce (British Army officer) (c. 1670–1739), British army lieutenant general and Member of Parliament
- Thomas Pearce (priest) (1820–1885), English clergyman, known under the pseudonym "Idstone" as an author on dogs
- Thomas Pearce (cricketer, born 1847) (1847–1898), English cricketer
- Thomas Pearce (Hip-Hop Artist, born 1988) (WaspKillas)
- Thomas Pearce (Maryland politician) (died 1936), American politician
- Thomas Ernest Pearce (1883–1941), British businessman and member of the Legislative Council of Hong Kong
- Thomas Pearce (MP), Member of Parliament for Weymouth and Melcombe Regis (1722–1737)
- Tom Pearce (politician), New Zealand politician, rugby union player and businessman
- Tom Pearce (cricketer) (1905–1994), English cricketer and rugby union official
- Tom Pearce (footballer) (born 1998), English footballer for Wigan Athletic
- Tom Pearce, a cast member of the British semi-reality television programme The Only Way Is Essex
- Alec Pearce (Thomas Alexander Pearce, 1910–1982), English cricketer
- Thomas Richard Pearce, (1859–1908), Irish sea captain.
- "Widecombe Fair" (song), also called Tom Pearce, Devon folk song

== See also ==
- Thomas Pierce or Peirse (1622–1691), English churchman and controversialist
