= Justice Pearce =

Justice Pearce may refer to:

- Edward Pearce, Baron Pearce (1901–1990), Lord Justice of Appeal from 1957 to 1962
- James Alfred Pearce (judge) (1840–1920), judge of the Maryland Court of Appeals
- John A. Pearce (born 1969), associate justice of the Utah Supreme Court
- Robert Pearce (judge) (fl. 1980s–2020s), associate justice of the Supreme Court of Tasmania

== See also ==
- Justice Pierce (disambiguation)
