= Walter Pierce =

Walter Pierce may refer to:

- Walter E. Pierce (1860–1951), real estate developer and mayor of Boise City, Idaho
- Walter M. Pierce (1861–1954), American politician and Governor of Oregon
- Walter Pierce (impresario) (born 1930), American performing arts impresario
- Walter Pierce (architect) (1920–2013), American modernist architect

== See also ==
- Walter Pearce (disambiguation)
