= William Winde =

English architect and soldier

Captain William Winde (c.1645–1722) was an English gentleman architect, whose military career under Charles II, resulting in fortifications and topographical surveys but lack of preferment, and his later career, following the Glorious Revolution, as designer or simply "conductor" of the works of country houses, has been epitomised by Howard Colvin, who said that "Winde ranks with Hooke, May, Pratt and Talman as one of the principal English country house architects of the late seventeenth century" (Colvin 1995, p 1066).

Winde was born in the Dutch Republic to English parents.

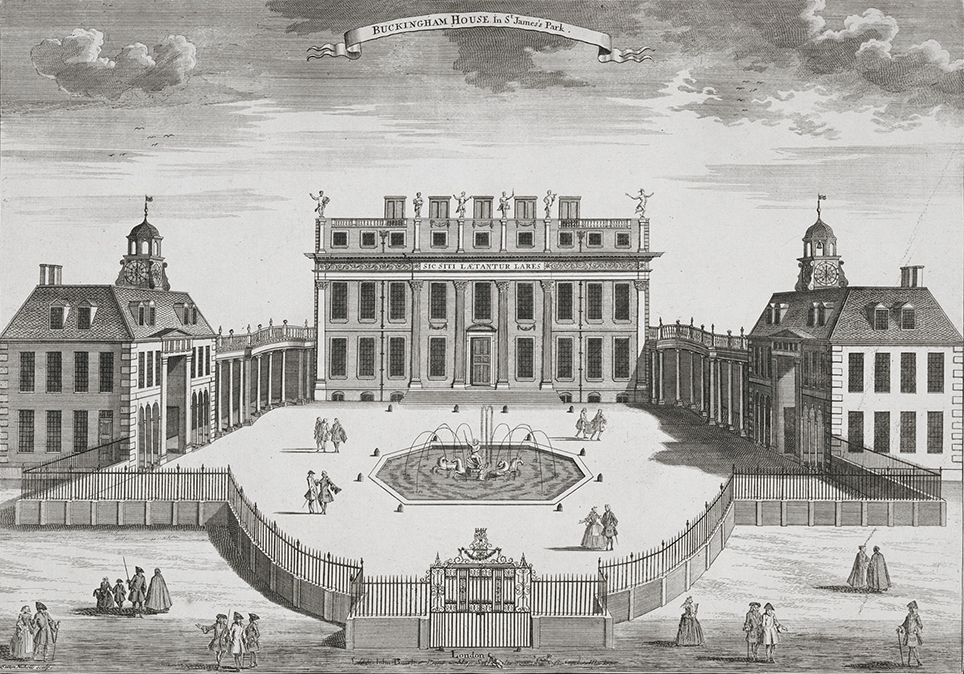
Engraving of Buckingham House, c. 1710

== Works ==
His work included:

- Hampstead Marshall, (for William Craven, 1st Earl of Craven), where he completed a house begun by Sir Balthazar Gerbier, c. 1662–1688, from the dates on many surviving drawings. Thomas Strong, mason; Edward Pierce, wood-carver; Edward Goudge, plasterer. Destroyed by fire 1718. Gate piers remain.
- Caversham Park, (also for Lord Craven), rebuilding the Elizabethan manor house after 1660. The estate was sold in 1697.
- Coombe Abbey, near Coventry (for the Earl of Craven). Rebuilt centre block and north wing, c. 1682–88. North wing demolished.
- Buckingham House (for John Sheffield, 1st Duke of Buckingham), 1702–05. Completely embodied in Buckingham Palace.
- Powis House, Lincoln's Inn Fields, London (for First Marquess of Powis) 1682–89. (later Newcastle House).
- Castle Bromwich Hall 1686–1703; the gardens here have been restored according to Winde's plans.

Possible attributions include:

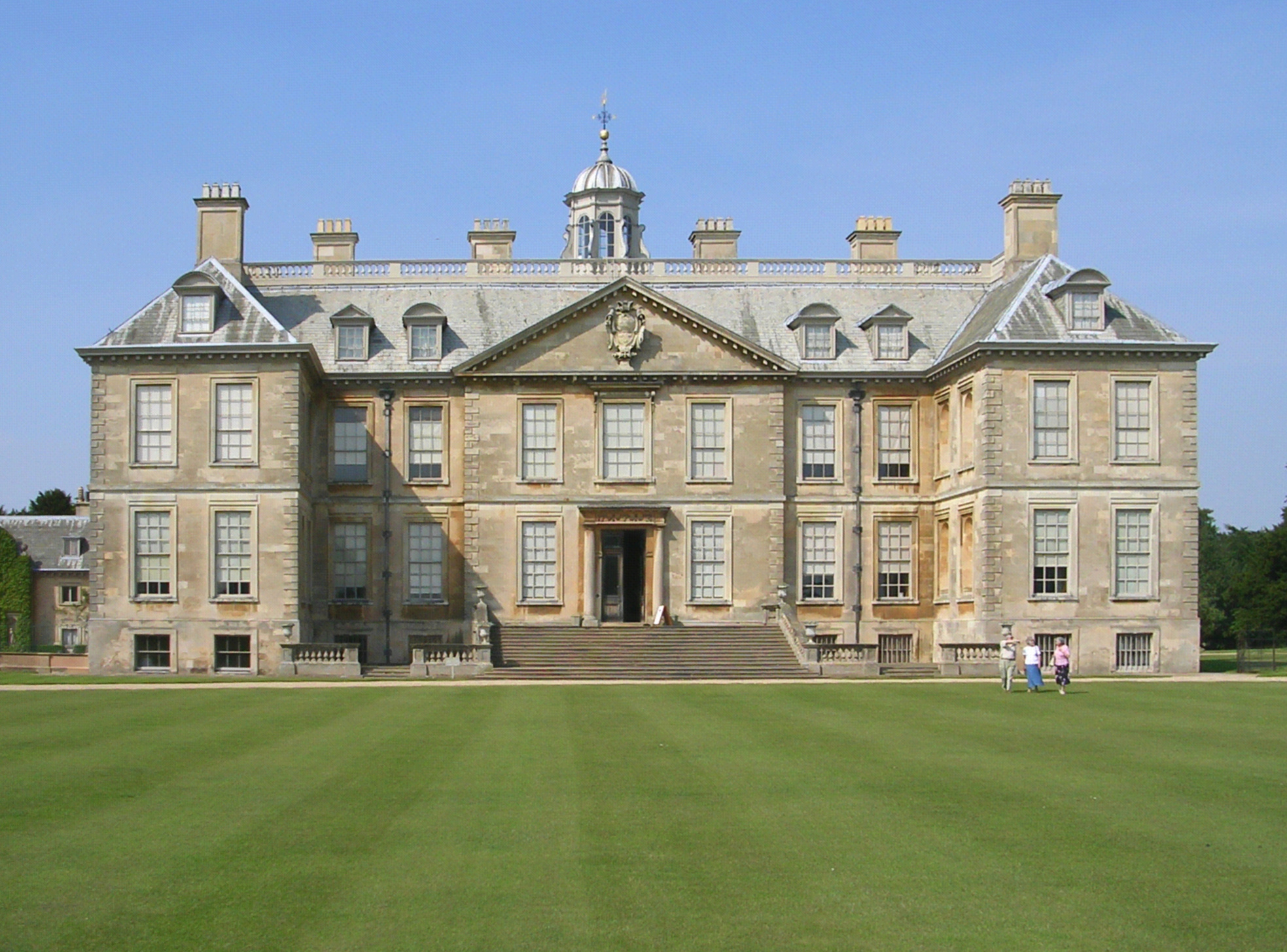
Belton House, Lincolnshire

- Belton House near Grantham, Lincolnshire
- Cliveden House, Buckinghamshire (for George Villiers, 2nd Duke of Buckingham) c.1676-8. Destroyed by fire 1795 and rebuilt.
- Wotton House, Buckinghamshire

Capt. Winde also gave designs for parterre gardens

== Family ==
Winde married Magdalene, daughter of Sir James Bridgeman. His correspondence with his cousin Lady Mary Bridgeman of Castle Bromwich Hall, is at the Staffordshire Record Office.
