= Franklin Pierce (disambiguation) =

Franklin Pierce (1804–1869) was the 14th president of the United States from 1853 to 1857.

Frank Pierce or Franklin Pierce may also refer to:

- Frank Pierce (athlete) (1883–1908), American marathon runner
- Frank Pierce (pole vaulter), co-winner of the pole vault at the 1933 USA Indoor Track and Field Championships
- Jack Pierce (politician) or Franklin Jack Pierce (1937–2022), Ontario politician

== See also ==
- Franklin Pearce (disambiguation)
