= William Peirce =

William Peirce may refer to:

- William S. Peirce (United States Army officer) (1864–1923), American general
- William H. Peirce, American civil engineer and metallurgist
- William Peirce (burgess), early Virginia planter, military officer and politician

== See also ==
- William Pierce (disambiguation)
