= Essendon, Hertfordshire =

Village in Hertfordshire, England

Coordinates: 51.7617°N 0.1531°W

Essendon
- Location within Hertfordshire
- Population: 580 (2011 Census)
- OS grid reference: TL275087
- Civil parish: Essendon
- District: Welwyn Hatfield
- Shire county: Hertfordshire
- Region: East
- Country: England
- Sovereign state: United Kingdom
- Post town: HATFIELD
- Postcode district: AL9
- Dialling code: 01707
- Police: Hertfordshire
- Fire: Hertfordshire
- Ambulance: East of England
- UK Parliament: Welwyn Hatfield
- Website: Essendon Parish Council

Essendon is a village and civil parish in Hertfordshire, England, 6 miles (10 km) south-west of Hertford.

The village is on the B158 road 330 feet (100 m) above sea level and has a view of the Lea Valley to the north. Although on an ancient site, St Mary's parish church dates mainly from the 17th and 18th centuries and was restored in 1883. The west tower dates from the 15th century and has eight bells, the oldest cast in 1681. The church contains an unusual Wedgwood ceramic font dated 1780 and several brasses and monuments. In 1916 the east end of the church was damaged by a bomb dropped by the German Navy Zeppelin L-16; two sisters were killed. There is a village pub named The Rose and Crown.

Historic houses in the parish include Camfield Place which was the home of the novelist Barbara Cartland and visited by Beatrix Potter. Nearby is Holwell Court, a Grade II listed building, built in about 1900 for Sir Ernest George; it is now converted to private apartments.

Essendon Place was the seat of the Barons Dimsdale of Russia; Thomas Dimsdale was an expert on the treatment of smallpox by inoculation and in 1768 he was invited to Russia to inoculate Catherine the Great. For his services there he was made a baron of the Russian Empire.

Bedwell Park is another manor house near to the village and is also the site of Essendon Country Club golf club. Bedwell End was the home of Deneys Reitz, High Commissioner for the Union of South Africa, until his death on 19 October 1944. At the outbreak of the Second Anglo-Boer War he joined the Boer forces at the age of seventeen and accompanied General J. C. Smuts on his famous raid in the Cape Colony, of which Reitz wrote in his autobiography, Commando. In World War I, as a lieutenant-colonel, he commanded the 1st Royal Scots Fusiliers on the Western Front in France.

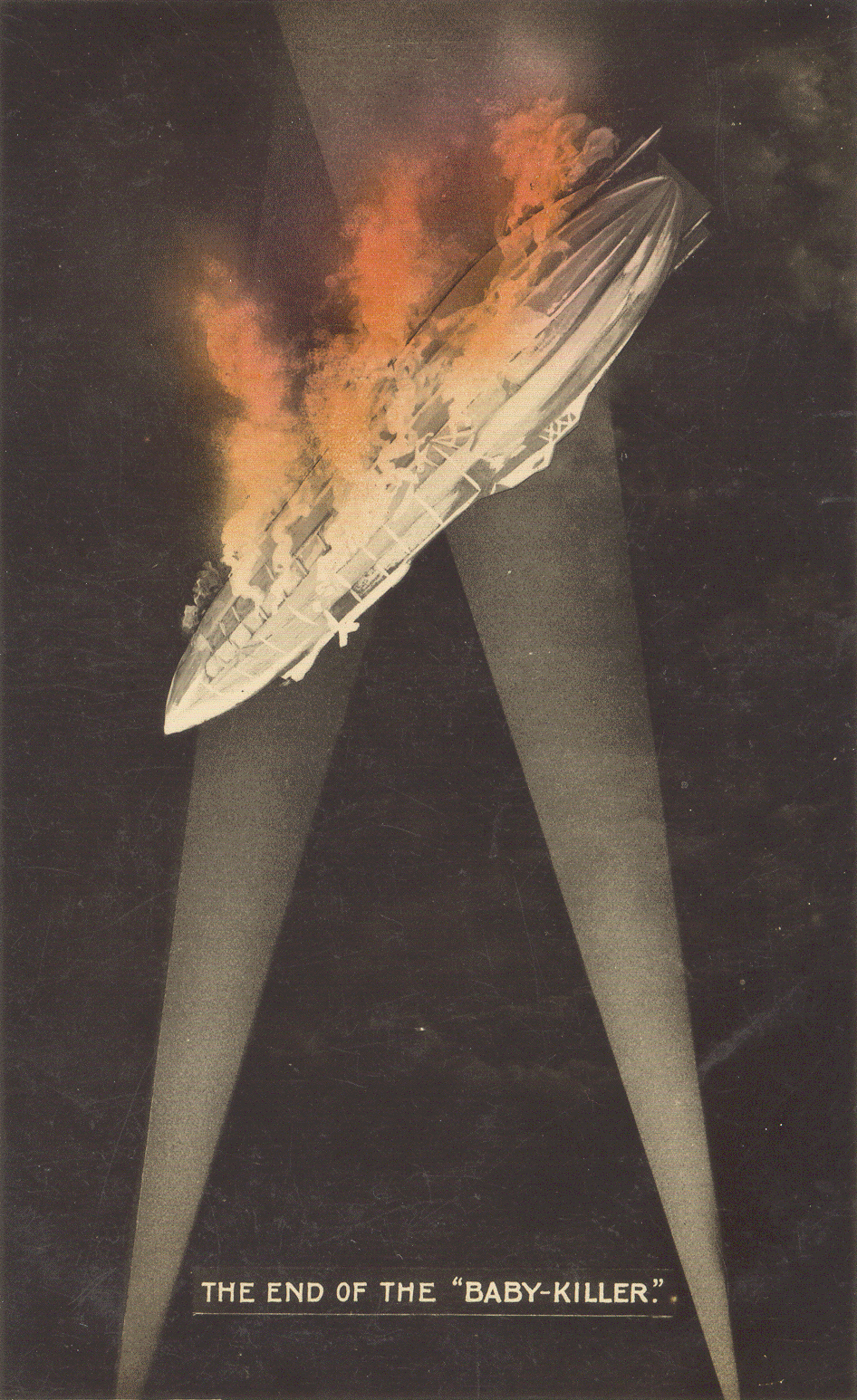
British propaganda postcard entitled "The End of the 'Baby-Killer'", depicting the shooting down of Schütte-Lanz SL 11

In the early morning of 3 September 1916 during World War I, several houses were destroyed and the church damaged, when Schütte-Lanz SL 11, a German airship returning from a bombing raid on London, jettisoned its remaining bombs. Two sisters, Frances (26), a Post Office telephonist, and Eleanor (12) Bamford, daughters of the village blacksmith, were killed. A plaque commemorating the event is on the wall of the church, where their funeral was also held. The airship was shot down shortly afterwards, while still over Hertfordshire, by Lieutenant Leefe Robinson, killing the entire crew. Robinson received the Victoria Cross for his action.

Essendon, a suburb of Melbourne, Victoria, Australia, is named after the village. Richard Green (1808-1878), whose father Isaac Green was either owner or tenant of Essendon watermill on the River Lea, arrived in Victoria in the 1850s and gave the name to the district.

== Notable people ==
- Sally Ann Howes, actor
- Simon Pegg, actor
- Thomas Pearce (1847–1898), first-class cricketer
