= Judge Pierce =

Judge Pierce may refer to:

- Allin H. Pierce (1897–1980), judge of the United States Tax Court
- David Pierce Jr. (1786–1872), judge of the Vermont court of common pleas
- Lawrence W. Pierce (1924–2020), judge of the United States Court of Appeals for the Second Circuit
- Samuel Pierce (1922–2000), judge of the New York Court of General Sessions

== See also ==
- Justice Pierce (disambiguation)
