= Bill Pierce =

Bill Pierce may refer to:

== Entertainment ==
- Bill Pierce (photographer) (born 1935), American photographer and journalist
- Bill Pierce (saxophonist) (born 1948), American jazz saxophonist
- Billie Pierce (1907–1974), jazz pianist
- Billy Pierce (choreographer) (1890–1933), African American choreographer and dancer

== Sports ==
- Bill Pierce (American football) (1909–1981), American college football player and coach
- Bill Pierce (baseball) (1890–1962), player and manager in the Negro leagues
- Billy Pierce (1927–2015), baseball pitcher

== See also ==
- Bill Pearce (1926–2010), singer, trombonist, and radio broadcaster
- Bill Peirce (born 1938), Ohio gubernatorial candidate
- Pierce (surname)
- William Pierce (disambiguation)
