= Jonathan Pearce =

Jonathan Pearce may refer to:

- Jonathan Pearce (commentator) (born 1959), English football commentator
- Jonathan Pearce (fighter) (born 1992), American mixed martial artist
- Jonathan Pearce (cricketer) (born 1957), English cricketer
