= Greg Pearce =

Greg Pearce is the name of:

- Greg Pearce (news presenter), Australian newsreader
- Greg Pearce (politician) (born 1955), Australian politician
- Greg Pearce (footballer) (born 1980), English footballer

== See also ==
- Greg Pierce (1950–2016), Australian former rugby league footballer, and coach
- Pearce (surname)
