= Steve Pearce =

Steve Pearce is the name of:

- Steve Pearce (politician) (born 1947), American politician
- Steve Pearce (baseball) (born 1983), American baseball player
- Stephen Pearce (1819–1904), English painter

== See also ==
- Steve Piearce (born 1974), English footballer
- Stevo Pearce (born 1962), English record label executive
- Steven Pierce (disambiguation)
- Stephen Pears (born 1962), English footballer
