= Edward Pierce =

Edward Pierce may refer to:

- Edward Pierce (priest) (1630/31–1694), Welsh Anglican priest and writer
- Edward Pierce (sculptor) (1630-1695) English sculptor who created the interior for many of Christopher Wren's churches
- Edward A. Pierce (1874–1974), American businessman and founder of E.A. Pierce & Co. (predecessor of Merrill Lynch)
- Edward C. Pierce (1930–2002), American politician
- Edward L. Pierce (1829–1897), American author
- Edward Pierce (Massachusetts judge) (1852–1938)
- Ed Pierce (baseball) (born 1968), former Major League Baseball pitcher
- Tedd Pierce (Edward Stacey Pierce III, 1906–1972), screenwriter of American animated cartoons

== In fiction ==
- Edward Pierce, the protagonist of the novel The Great Train Robbery by Michael Crichton

== See also ==
- Edward Pearce (disambiguation)
