= George Pearse =

George Pearse may refer to:

- George Pearse, High Sheriff of Bedfordshire in 1833
- George Pearse, auto racer in the 1947 Australian Grand Prix

== See also ==
- George Pearce (disambiguation)
- George Peirce (disambiguation)
- George Pierce (disambiguation)
