= David Pearce =

Dave or David Pearce may refer to:

- Dave Pearce (born 1963), British dance DJ and record producer
- Dave Pearce (footballer) (born 1959), English former footballer
- David Pearce (philosopher), British transhumanist philosopher
- David Pearce, musician with Flying Saucer Attack
- David Pearce (economist) (1941–2005), pioneer of environmental economics
- David Pearce (boxer) (1959–2000), Welsh former British heavyweight boxing champion
- David Pearce (politician) (born 1960), Missouri politician
- David D. Pearce (born 1950), U.S. ambassador to Greece
- David Mark Pearce (born 1972), British guitarist
- David Pearce (athlete), British athlete
- David Pearce (born c. 2000), designer of the reverse of the 2017 12-sided UK pound coin

== See also ==
- David Pierce (disambiguation)
