= Edward Pearce =

Eddie or Edward Pearce may refer to:

- Eddie Pearce (born 1952), American golfer
- Edward Charles Pearce (1862–1928), Chairman of the Shanghai Municipal Council
- Edward Pearce (journalist) (1939–2018), English political journalist and writer
- Edward Pearce (politician) (1833–1922), New Zealand businessman
- Edward Pearce, Baron Pearce (1901–1990), British judge
- Edward Lovett Pearce (1699–1733), Irish architect
- Edward Pearce (British Army officer), British Army general, father of Edward Lovett Pearce
- Edward Pierce (sculptor) (1630–1695), English sculptor and architectural sculptor

== See also ==
- Edward Pierce (disambiguation)
