= William Pearce =

William Pearce may refer to:

== Entertainment ==
- William Houghton Sprague Pearce (1864–1935), American artist
- Bill Pearce (1926–2010), American singer and trombonist
- Billy Pearce (born 1951), English actor and comedian

== Politics ==
- Sir William Pearce, 1st Baronet (1833–1888), British politician, Conservative MP for Glasgow Govan, 1885–1889
- Sir William Pearce, 2nd Baronet (1861–1907), British politician, Conservative MP for Plymouth, 1892–1895
- William Pearce (Liberal politician) (1853–1932), British politician, Liberal MP for Limehouse, 1906–1922
- William Pearce (Australian politician) (1855–1922), member of the Tasmanian Parliament
- Bill Pearce (politician) (1894–1968), American politician in the state of Florida

== Other ==
- William Pearce (civil engineer) (1848–1930), surveyor, statistician, planner and administrator in western Canada
- William Pearce (priest) (1744–1820), English clergyman and academic

== See also ==
- Pearce (surname)
- Pearce baronets
- William Pierce (disambiguation)
