= Jonathan Pearce (cricketer) =

English cricketer

Personal information
- Full name: Jonathan Peter Pearce
- Born: 18 April 1957 (age 69); Newcastle upon Tyne, Northumberland, England
- Batting: Right-handed
- Bowling: Slow left-arm orthodox

Domestic team information
- Years: Team
- 1978–1979: Oxford University

Career statistics
Competition	First-class
Matches	7
Runs scored	22
Batting average	3.66
100s/50s	–/–
Top score	8*
Balls bowled	951
Wickets	11
Bowling average	45.27
5 wickets in innings	–
10 wickets in match	–
Best bowling	4/94
Catches/stumpings	2/–
- Source: Cricinfo, 26 June 2020

Jonathan Peter Pearce (born 18 April 1957) is an English former first-class cricketer.

Pearce was born at Newcastle upon Tyne in April 1957. He was educated at Ampleforth College, before going up to St Benet's Hall, Oxford. While studying at Oxford, he played first-class cricket for Oxford University in 1978 and 1979, making seven appearances and gaining a blue. Playing as a slow left-arm orthodox bowler, he took 11 wickets at an average of 45.27, with best figures of 4 for 94.

After graduating from Oxford Pearce became a solicitor in corporate law, specialising in mergers, acquisitions and corporate finance. He sits on the governing council at Benenden School and was treasurer of the Free Foresters Cricket Club from 2010 to 2022. Pearce is married with two sons.
