= Mark Pearce =

Mark Pearce may refer to:

- Mark Pearce (actor) (born 1976), English actor
- Mark Pearce (runner) (born 1996), English steeplechaser
- Mark Gaston Pearce, American lawyer, arbitrator and university professor
