= Jacqueline Pearce (author) =

Canadian writer

- Occupation: Children's Book Writer
- Writing career
- Language: English
- Genres: Young Adult literature, animals, historical fiction
- Website: www.jacquelinepearce.ca

Jacqueline Pearce is a Canadian author of books for children and teens. She writes contemporary and historical fiction, as well as poetry.

== Biography ==
Pearce was born in Vancouver, Canada in 1962. She obtained a bachelor's degree in English Literature, from the University of Victoria (1985) and a master's degree in environmental studies (with an emphasis on environmental education and environmental thought) from York University (1990). While at York University, she helped found the graduate student journal Undercurrents. Pearce's young adult short story "The Trickster" won first prize in the 1988 Thistledown short story contest and was published in the anthology Up All Night edited by Peter Carver (Thistledown Press, 1989).

== Genres and recognitions ==
Her historical fiction includes The Reunion, about a multicultural community on Vancouver Island affected by the internment of Japanese-Canadians during World War II, and Discovering Emily, introducing children to the 19th century childhood of artist Emily Carr. Her book Dog House Blues, about human-animal interaction, bullying, was published by Scholastic Canada for its Social Responsibility Book Club and featured in the "Moving Up with Literacy Place" resource for grade 4–6 classrooms. It and The Truth About Rats (and Dogs) were both endorsed by the British Columbia Society for the Prevention of Cruelty to Animals. Her later writings Manga Touch and Mystery of the Missing Luck introduce young readers to Japanese culture.

== Books and awards ==
- Flood Warning (Orca 2012): Canadian Children's Book Centre Best Books 2012
- Mystery of the Missing Luck (Orca 2011): Canadian Children's Book Centre Best Books 2011
- Manga Touch (Orca 2007): Canadian Children's Book Centre Best Books starred selection 2008; Resource Links "The Year’s Best" 2007
- The Truth about Rats (and Dogs) (Orca 2006): Hackmatack Award short list 2008; Canadian Children's Book Centre Best Books 2006
- Dog House Blues (Orca 2005): Langley Book of the Year short list 2008; Canadian Children's Book Centre Best Books 2005
- Emily's Dream (Orca 2005): Canadian Children's Book Centre Best Books 2005
- Discovering Emily (Orca 2004): Canadian Children's Book Centre Best Books 2004
- Weeds and other stories (Thistledown 2003): Saskatchewan Book Award for Publishing in Education short list 2004; Canadian Children's Book Centre Best Books 2003
- The Reunion (Orca 2002): Chocolate Lily Award short list 2004; Canadian Children's Book Centre Best Books 2002
- "The Trickster" (published in Opening Tricks, Peter Carver, ed.): first place, "Young Adult Short Stories" 1998
