= Joseph Pearce (disambiguation) =

Joseph Pearce (born 1961) is an English-born Catholic writer.

Joseph Pearce may also refer to:

- Joseph Chilton Pearce (1926–2016), American writer
- Joseph Algernon Pearce (1893–1988), Canadian astrophysicist

== See also ==
- Joe Pearce (disambiguation)
