= Barcley Pearce =

Canadian ice hockey player

- Born: June 13, 1970 (age 55) Edmonton, Alberta, Canada
- Played for: Basingstoke Beavers; Milton Keynes Kings; Humberside Hawks; Swindon Icelords; Guildford Flames
- Playing career: 1994–2000

Barcley Pearce (born June 13, 1970) is a Canadian former professional ice hockey forward from Edmonton, Alberta. Pearce played junior and university ice hockey in Canada, then moved to Britain in 1994 where he played professional ice hockey until 2000 when his career was ended by injury. Pearce also made two appearances with the Canadian National Team in exhibition play.

== Junior ==
Pearce began playing for Sherwood Park Crusaders in the AJHL. In 1989-90 he played 13 times in the WHL junior league for the Spokane Chiefs recording 2 assists.

== College ==
In 1990, Pearce started college at University of Alberta where he played for the Alberta Golden Bears. Between 1990 and 1995 he made 135 appearances scoring 58 goals and adding 77 assists.

== International play ==
On two separate occasions Pearce made single appearances for the Canadian National Team. He failed to record any points in either game.

== Professional career ==
Pearce moved over to Britain during the 1994–95 season to play for the Basingstoke Beavers in the BHL the same team his former U.Alberta team-mate Stan Marple was the assistant coach for. He was an instant hit that season, scoring better than 2 points per game. The following season was split between Humberside Seahawks and Milton Keynes Kings, in total he scored 87 points in 45 games. It was fellow Alberta native Stan Marple who again enticed him to a new team (Kings) where he was now head coach. Pearce moved onto play for the Swindon Icelords in 1996–97, once again following Marple. In 1997 he made the move to Guildford Flames again with Marple and this would be where he would spend the rest of his playing career.

Pearce would go on to make 180 appearances in total for the Flames and score 148 goals and 184 assists in all competitions, placing him in the top point scorers of All-time.

His career was cut short by an eye injury sustained when he collided with the goal post while playing for the Flames in Fife against the Fife Flyers.
