= Gary Pearce =

Gary Pearce or Pierce may refer to:

- Gary Pearce (rugby) (born 1960), Welsh rugby league footballer
- Gary Pearce (rugby union) (born 1956), English rugby union player
- Gary Pearce (rower) (born 1944), Australian rower
- Gary Pierce (born c. 1952), American politician in Arizona
- Gary Pierce (footballer) (born 1951), English former football goalkeeper

== See also ==
- Gareth Peirce (born 1940), British lawyer
- Gareth Pierce (born 1981), Welsh actor
- Gary Pearse (born 1953), Australian rugby union player
