= John Elsum =

English author

John Elsum (fl. 1700–1705) was an English author.

Elsum was the author of a collection of 'Epigrams upon the Paintings of the most eminent Masters, Antient and Modern, with Reflexions upon the several Schools of Painting, by J. E., Esq.' (8vo, London, 1700). The similarity of the initials has caused this work to be sometimes ascribed wrongly to John Evelyn. Some of the epigrams are translations from Michael Siloa's 'De Romana Pictura et Sculptura'. Elsum also published in 1703 'The Art of Painting after the Italian Manner, with Practical Observations on the Principal Colours and Directions how to know a Good Picture;' and in 1704 'A Description of the celebrated pieces of Paintings of the most Ancient Masters, in verse.'

He was most likely the John Elsum who matriculated at Queen's College, Oxford in 1667 aged 16, becoming a barrister-at-law at the Inner Temple, London in 1673. His father (a haberdasher named John) bequeathed him the freehold of the Seaven Stars in the Strand, which was leased to Thomas Miller in 1683. John died in London in 1714, bequeathing property and inherited estate to a nephew and a cousin.
