= William S. Pierce =

American surgeon (born 1937)

William S. Pierce (born January 12, 1937) is an American cardiothoracic surgeon and chemical engineer who led development of the first pneumatic heart assist pump. The Pierce-Donachy Ventricular Assist Device, also known as the Penn State Assist Pump, was designated an International Historic Mechanical Engineering Landmark by the American Society of Mechanical Engineers in 1990.

Born in Wilkes-Barre, Pennsylvania, Pierce received his B.S. degree from Lehigh University in chemical engineering in 1958 and subsequently attended the University of Pennsylvania School of Medicine where he obtained an M.D. degree in 1962, together with an Alpha Omega Alpha honor. He received his surgical training at the University of Pennsylvania and at the National Heart, Lung and Blood Institute.

In 1970, Pierce was asked to join the surgical faculty at the new College of Medicine of Pennsylvania State University (Penn State Hershey Medical Center). He was appointed professor of surgery in 1977 and subsequently served as chief of the Division of Artificial Organs, chief of the Division of Cardiothoracic Surgery, director of surgical research, and associate chair of the Department of Surgery. He was awarded the Faculty Scholar Medal in 1983 and in 1986 was named Evan Pugh Professor, the university's highest academic honor.

At Penn State, Pierce established an interdisciplinary group to develop mechanical circulatory support devices and the artificial heart. The original pneumatic heart assist pump, now known as the Thoratec ventricular assist device (Thoratec Pneumatic VAD), has been used in nearly 4,000 patients for right, left, and biventricular support. His pioneering work led him to be considered around the world as a father of the ventricular assist device.

The group, including Pierce, James Donachy and its current chief, Gerson Rosenberg, went on in partnership with Arrow International of Reading, Pennsylvania, to develop the ArrowLion Heart, an implantable, permanent, left ventricular heart assist system powered by a wearable, external NiCd battery. The pump represented the first successful use of a transcutaneous energy transfer system, eliminating any transcutaneous wire, and the first clinical use of a compliance sac, eliminating the need for a transcutaneous vent. It has been used in over thirty patients to date.

Pierce's artificial-organs group subsequently focused on a completely implantable electromechanical artificial heart consisting of two prosthetic blood pumps actuated by pusher plates driven by a compact DC motor. This biventricular heart pump, with its microprocessor-based digital control system, transcutaneous energy transfer system, and implanted compliance sac, has been successfully used in numerous calf implant studies.

In 2005, Pierce received the Barney Clark Award, an award for significant accomplishments in the biomedical field.

Pierce received the 2007 Jacobson Innovation Award, given by the American College of Surgeons to "living surgeons who have been innovators of a new development or technique in any field of surgery." He won "in recognition of his pioneering work in the conception and development of mechanical circulatory support and the total artificial mechanical heart and his contributions to surgical bioengineering and patient care." Pierce has edited three books and published more than 280 articles and 90 book chapters. He holds nine United States patents.

== Publications ==
Some representative publications:

- Rosenberg G, Snyder A, Weiss W, Mehta S, Felder G, Kusagawa H and Pierce WS: A reduced sized implantable artificial heart for women and small men. Am. Soc. Artif. Intern. Organs Abstracts 42(2): 7, 1996.
- Snyder AJ, Pierce WS, Rosenberg G, Weiss WJ and Runt J: Progress in the development of an innovative ventricular assist system. Am. Soc. Artif. Intern. Organs Abstracts 42(2): 13 1, March–April, 1996.
- Weiss W, Rosenberg G, Snyder A, Rawhouser M, Pierce WS, Kusagawa H, Mehta S, Marlotte J, Nazarian R, Ford S, Hicks D: Recent improvements in the completely implanted total artificial heart. Am. Soc. Artif. Intern. Organs Abstracts 42(2): 9, 1996.
- Pierce WS: Chapter 54: The Artificial Heart. In, Textbook of Surgery: The Biological Basis of Modern Surgical Practice. 15th Edition. Ed., D.C. Sabiston, Jr. W.B.Saunders Co., Armonk, New York. 1997. Pages 2228–2232.
- Richenbacher WE and Pierce WS: Chapter 19: Assisted Circulation and the Mechanical Heart. In, Heart Disease. Fifth Edition. Ed., E. Braunwald, M.D. W.B. Saunders Co., Orlando, Florida. 1996. Pages 534–547.

== See also ==
- Cardiopulmonary bypass
- Cardiac surgery
