= Eric Pearce =

Eric Pearce may refer to:

- Eric Pearce (broadcaster) (1905–1997), Australian broadcaster
- Eric Pearce (athlete) (1936–1997), British Paralympian
- Eric Pearce (field hockey) (1931–2026), Australian field hockey player

== See also ==
- Erik Pears (born 1982), American football player
