= John Pearce =

John Pearce may refer to:

- John Jamison Pearce (1826–1912), U.S. Representative from Pennsylvania
- John Bond Pearce (1843–1903), architect in Norwich, England
- John Pearce (tennis) (1923–1992), Australian tennis player
- John Pearce (actor) (1927–2000), American actor
- John Pearce (footballer) (1940–2022), English footballer
- John Pearce (American football) (born 1947), American football coach
- John M. Pearce, British psychologist
- John Pearce (equestrian) (born 1960), Canadian Olympic equestrian
- John A. Pearce (born 1969), associate justice of the Utah Supreme Court
- John Pearce (boxer) (born 1971), English Olympic boxer
- John Pearce (handballer) (born 1987), British handball player
- John Pearce (entertainer) (born 1991), member of the Australian pop groups Justice Crew and The Wiggles

== See also ==
- John Pierce (disambiguation)
