= Jack Pierce =

Jack Pierce may refer to:

- Jack Pierce (make-up artist) (1889–1968), Hollywood makeup artist
- Jack Pierce (oilman) (1924–1991), Canadian oil and gas executive
- Jack Pierce (politician) (1937–2022), politician in Ontario, Canada
- Jack Pierce (baseball) (1948–2012), former Major League Baseball player
- Jack Pierce (hurdler) (born 1962), American hurdler

== See also ==
- John Pierce (disambiguation)
