= Dave Pearce (footballer) =

English footballer

Personal information
- Full name: David Pearce
- Date of birth: 7 December 1959 (age 66)
- Place of birth: Northolt, England
- Height: 1.82 m (5 ft 11 1/2 in)
- Position: Forward

Senior career*
Years	Team	Apps	(Gls)
1977–1978	Millwall	1	(0)
1978–1979	Margate	8	(2)
1979–1980	Wealdstone	1	(0)
1980–1985	Harrow Borough	?	(?)
1982	→ Hayes (loan)	?	(?)
1985–1986	Barnet	20	(4)
1986–1987	Dagenham	41	(10)
1987–1990	Wokingham Town	?	(?)
1990–1994	Kingstonian	?	(?)
1992	→ Hayes (loan)	?	(?)
1994–1996	Hayes	?	(?)
1996	Chertsey Town	?	(?)
1996–1997	Sutton United	29	(12)
1997–1998	Hampton	15	(8)
1998	Worthing	19	(2)
- * Club domestic league appearances and goals

David Pearce (born 7 December 1959) is an English former professional footballer who played as a forward in the Football League for Millwall.
