= Robert Peirce III =

American lawyer

Robert Peirce III is an attorney at Robert Peirce and Associates P.C., a plaintiff's law firm based in Pittsburgh, Pennsylvania. Peirce represents clients with cases related to personal injury and violations of individual rights. In 15 years of practice he has worked on a variety of cases, seeking compensation for clients in both small and large settlements.

== Notable cases ==
Peirce pursued a civil rights class action against the Allegheny County Jail alleging that the jail's practice of conducting blanket strip searches of misdemeanor detainees before they go to trial is unconstitutional. Peirce's firm obtained class certification and a preliminary injunction, which prohibited the jail from continuing this practice until the case was resolved.

In 2007, Peirce's firm filed a joint lawsuit against online fan club MileyWorld, on behalf of fan club members who claimed they were misled by the website's promise to provide preferred access to concert tickets. By paying the membership fee, fans were told they would have priority access to the much sought-after tickets through a special presale. When shows sold out instantaneously and left many members empty-handed, disgruntled fans joined forces to file an official complaint. "They deceptively lured thousands of individuals into purchasing memberships into the Miley Cyrus Fan Club," Peirce explained in an article in USA Today."

In 2003, when a hepatitis A outbreak at a Chi-Chi's restaurant chain sickened more than 600 people, Peirce filed two suits on behalf of clients who had fallen ill from the contamination. He sought compensation for his clients to cover doctor's bills and lost time at work. The case was resolved for an undisclosed amount.
