= George Pearce (disambiguation) =

Sir George Pearce (1870–1952) was a Western Australian politician.

George Pearce may also refer to:

- George Pearce (English cricketer) (1908–1986), English cricketer who played for Sussex
- George Pearce (New Zealand politician) (1863–1935), New Zealand politician
- George Pearce (Queensland politician) (1917–1992), MHR for Capricornia
- George Pearce (South Australian politician) (1826–1908), MHA for East Torrens
- George Pearce (actor) (1865–1940), American actor
- George Hamilton Pearce (1921–2015), Archbishop of Fiji

== See also ==
- George Pearse (disambiguation)
- George Pierce (disambiguation)
- George Peirce (disambiguation)
