= Charles Pearce =

Charles Pearce may refer to:

- Charlie Pearce, New Zealand rugby league international
- Charles Pearce (calligrapher) (born 1943), calligrapher
- Charles E. M. Pearce (1940–2012), New Zealand mathematician
- Charles E. Pearce (1842–1902), United States congressman from Missouri
- Charles H. Pearce, African Methodist Episcopal clergyman in Florida
- Charles Sprague Pearce (1851–1914), American painter
- Charles Thomas Pearce (1815–1883), English physician and opponent to mandatory vaccination

== See also ==
- Charles Ormerod Cato Pearse (1884–1953), South African cricketer
- Charles Sanders Peirce (1839–1914), American logician, mathematician, scientist, philosopher
- Charles Pierce (disambiguation)
