= Robert Pearce =

Robert Pearce may refer to:

- Robert Pearce (politician) (1840–1922), British Member of Parliament for Leek, 1906–1910 and 1910–1918
- Bobby Pearce (rower) (1905–1976), Australian-Canadian sculler
- Robert Pearce (wrestler) (1908–1996), American Olympic wrestler
- Bob Pearce (born 1946), politician
- Robert A. Pearce (born 1951), vice-chancellor of the University of Wales, Lampeter, 2003–2008
- Bobby Pearce (designer) (born 1961), American costume designer
- Robert Pearce (judge), associate justice of the Supreme Court of Tasmania

== See also ==
- Robert Pierce (disambiguation)
- Robert Peirce (disambiguation)
- Bobby Pierce (disambiguation)
