= James Pierce (disambiguation) =

James Pierce (1900–1983) was an American actor.

James Pierce may also refer to:

- James Pieronnet Pierce (1825–1897), American pioneer entrepreneur in California
- James F. Pierce (1830–1905), American state senator from New York
- James Pierce (curler) (born 1963), American wheelchair Paralympian
- Jimmy Pierce, Marvel Comics Punisher superhero, first appearance 1993

== See also ==
- James Pierce Jr. House, American historic home built in 1833
- Todd James Pierce (born 1965), American novelist and short story writer
- James Peirce (c. 1674–1726), English dissenting minister
- James Pearce (disambiguation)
