= Richard Pierce =

Richard, Rich, Rick, or Dick Pierce may refer to:

== People ==
- Richard Pierce (historian) (1918–2004), American historian
- Richard Pierce (publisher) (died 1691), printer of Publick Occurrences Both Forreign and Domestick
- Richard Pierce (rugby union), English international rugby union player
- Richard J. Pierce, American legal scholar at George Washington School of Law
- Richard S. Pierce (1927–1992) American mathematician
- Rick Pierce, American musician, member of TKO
- Ricky Pierce (born 1959), American basketball player

== Fictional characters ==
- Richard Pierce, a character in the 2004 novel Little Children and the 2006 film adaptation
- Richard Pierce, a character in the 1969 novel The Venom Business

== See also ==
- Richard Pearce (disambiguation)
- Richard Pearse (1877–1953), New Zealand farmer and inventor
