= Richard Pearce =

Richard Pearce may refer to:

- Richard Pearce (director) (born 1943), American film and television director
- Richard Pearce (actor) (born 1961), British actor and voice actor
- Richard Pearce (botanist) (c. 1835–1868), Victorian plant collector
- Richard Aslatt Pearce (1855–1928), Victorian clergyman
- Dickey Pearce (1836–1908), American baseball player
- Richard Pearse (1877–1953), New Zealand aviator and inventor

== See also ==
- Richard Pierce (disambiguation)
