= Kevin Pearce =

Kevin Pearce may refer to:

- Kevin Pearce (cricketer) (born 1960), Australian cricketer
- Kevin Pearce (writer) (born 1964), English music journalist and author
- Kevin Pearce (snowboarder) (born 1987), American snowboarder from Norwich, Vermont
- Kevin Pearce (rugby league) (born 1935/36), New Zealand rugby league player
