= John Pierce =

John Pierce may refer to:

- John Davis Pierce (1797–1882), American minister and legislator
- John B. Pierce (1844–1917), American industrialist
- John M. Pierce (1886–1958), American amateur astronomer
- John L. Pierce (1895–1959), U.S. Army general
- John Reeves Pierce (1906–1943), U.S. Navy officer
- John R. Pierce (1910–2002), American engineer, professor, and author
- John J. Pierce (born 1941), American science fiction editor, son of John R. Pierce
- John Pierce (tenor) (born 1959), American operatic tenor
- John Pierce (public servant), Australian civil servant

== See also ==
- John Pearce (disambiguation)
- Jack Pierce (disambiguation)
