= Larry Pierce =

Larry Pierce may refer to:

- Larry Pierce (figure skater) (1937–1961), American ice dancer
- Larry S. Pierce (1941–1965), American soldier and Medal of Honor recipient
- Larry Pierce (singer) (1950–2018), American singer
- Larry Pierce (jockey) (born 1945), retired American Thoroughbred horse racing jockey

== See also ==
- Lawrence W. Pierce (1924–2020), American federal judge
