= George Pierce =

George Pierce may refer to:

- George Pierce (backstage doorman), American backstage doorman
- George Pierce (baseball) (1888–1935), American baseball player
- George E. Pierce, United States Navy submarine commander
- George Edmond Pierce (1794–1871), American minister and president of Western Reserve University
- George Foster Pierce (1811–1884), American Methodist bishop and college president
- George H. Pierce (1872–1967), New York politician
- George T. Pierce (c. 1823–1874), New York politician
- G. W. Pierce (George Washington Pierce, 1872–1956), American physicist
- USS George F. Pierce

== See also ==
- George Peirce (disambiguation)
- George Pearce (disambiguation)
- George Pearse (disambiguation)
