= Walter Pearce =

Walter Pearce may also refer to:

- Walter Pearce (English cricketer)
- Walter Pearce (New Zealand cricketer)
- Walter Bryan Pearce, painter
- Pard Pearce (Walter Irving Pearce), American football player
- Walter Pearce, character in Comeback Season

== See also ==
- Walter Pierce (disambiguation)
