= Frank Pearce (footballer) =

Australian rules footballer

Personal information
- Full name: Francis Lindsay Pearce
- Born: 13 June 1904; Chiltern, Victoria
- Died: 29 July 1969 (aged 65); Parkville, Victoria
- Height: 177 cm (5 ft 10 in)
- Weight: 71 kg (157 lb)

Playing career^{1}
Years	Club	Games (Goals)
1929–1931	Fitzroy	21 (0)
1932–1933	North Melbourne	20 (1)
Total		41 (1)
- ^{1} Playing statistics correct to the end of 1933.

Francis Lindsay Pearce (13 June 1904 – 29 July 1969) was an Australian rules footballer who played with Fitzroy and North Melbourne in the Victorian Football League (VFL).

Pearce later served in the Australian Army during World War II.
