= David Pierce =

David Pierce may refer to:

- David Hyde Pierce (born 1959), American actor, director and comedian
- David Pierce (politician), American politician in New Hampshire
- Dave Pierce (born 1972), Canadian songwriter, composer and producer
- David Pierce (baseball) (born 1962), American college baseball coach
- David Pierce Jr. (1786–1872), Vermont lawyer and politician

== See also ==
- David Pearce (disambiguation)
