= Charles Pierce =

Charles Pierce may refer to:

- Charles Wilson Pierce (1823–1907), U.S. Representative from Alabama
- Charlie W. Pierce (1864–1939), Florida pioneer and author
- Charles H. Pierce (1875–1944), Philippine–American War Medal of Honor recipient
- Charlie Pierce (footballer) (1917–2007), Australian rules footballer
- Charles Pierce (female impersonator) (1926–1999), American female impersonator
- Charles B. Pierce (1938–2010), American film director
- Charlie Pierce (Charles P. Pierce, born 1953), American sportswriter, political blogger, and author

== See also ==
- Charles Sanders Peirce (1839–1914), American logician, mathematician, scientist, philosopher, whose family name is often misspelled "Pierce"
- Charles Pearce (disambiguation)
- Charles Ormerod Cato Pearse (1884–1953), South African cricketer
- Charles Pierce Davey (1925–2002), American boxer
