= Leslie Pearce =

Leslie or Les Pearce may refer to:

- Leslie Pearce (director) (1887–1977), New Zealand film director
- Les Pearce (general) (1918–2002), senior commander in the New Zealand Army and rugby union official
- Les Pearce (Welsh rugby) (1923–2018), Welsh rugby union and rugby league player and coach
