= Thomas Pearce (cricketer, born 1847) =

English cricketer

Personal information
- Full name: Thomas Albert Pearce
- Born: 11 May 1847; Essendon, Hertfordshire, England
- Died: 20 August 1898 (aged 51); St Albans, Hertfordshire, England
- Batting: Right-handed
- Bowling: Right-arm roundarm slow

Domestic team information
- Years: Team
- 1874–1876: Marylebone Cricket Club

Career statistics
Competition	First-class
Matches	5
Runs scored	31
Batting average	4.37
100s/50s	–/–
Top score	21
Catches/stumpings	4/–
- Source: Cricinfo, 30 March 2019

Thomas Albert Pearce (11 May 1847 – 20 August 1898) was an English first-class cricketer.

Pearce was born at Essendon and made his debut in first-class cricket for the South against the Marylebone Cricket Club (MCC) at Lord's in 1872. He next appeared in first-class cricket in 1874, when he played for the MCC against Nottinghamshire at Trent Bridge. He made two first-class appearances in 1875, playing for the South in the North v South fixture and for the Players of the South against the Gentlemen of the South. He made a final first-class appearance in 1876, appearing for the MCC against Nottinghamshire. Across his five first-class appearances, Pearce scored 35 runs, with a high score of 21. He died at St Albans in August 1898.
