= Frank Pearce (1870s pitcher) =

American baseball player (1860–1926)

- Pitcher
- Born: March 30, 1860; Jefferson County, Kentucky
- Died: November 13, 1926 (aged 66); Louisville, Kentucky
- Batted: Unknown Threw: Unknown

MLB debut
- October 4, 1876, for the Louisville Grays

Last MLB appearance
- October 4, 1876, for the Louisville Grays

MLB statistics
- Pitching record: 0-0
- Earned run average: 4.50
- Strikeouts: 1
- Stats at Baseball Reference

Teams
- Louisville Grays (1876)

Franklin Johnson Pearce (1860–1926) was an American Major League Baseball player who appeared as a relief pitcher in one game for the 1876 Louisville Grays of the National League. He was 16 years, 188 days old on the day of his lone major league appearance, making him one of the half-dozen youngest players in major league history—and he remains the youngest ever to be making his final ML appearance.
