= James Alfred Pearce (judge) =

American judge (1840–1920)

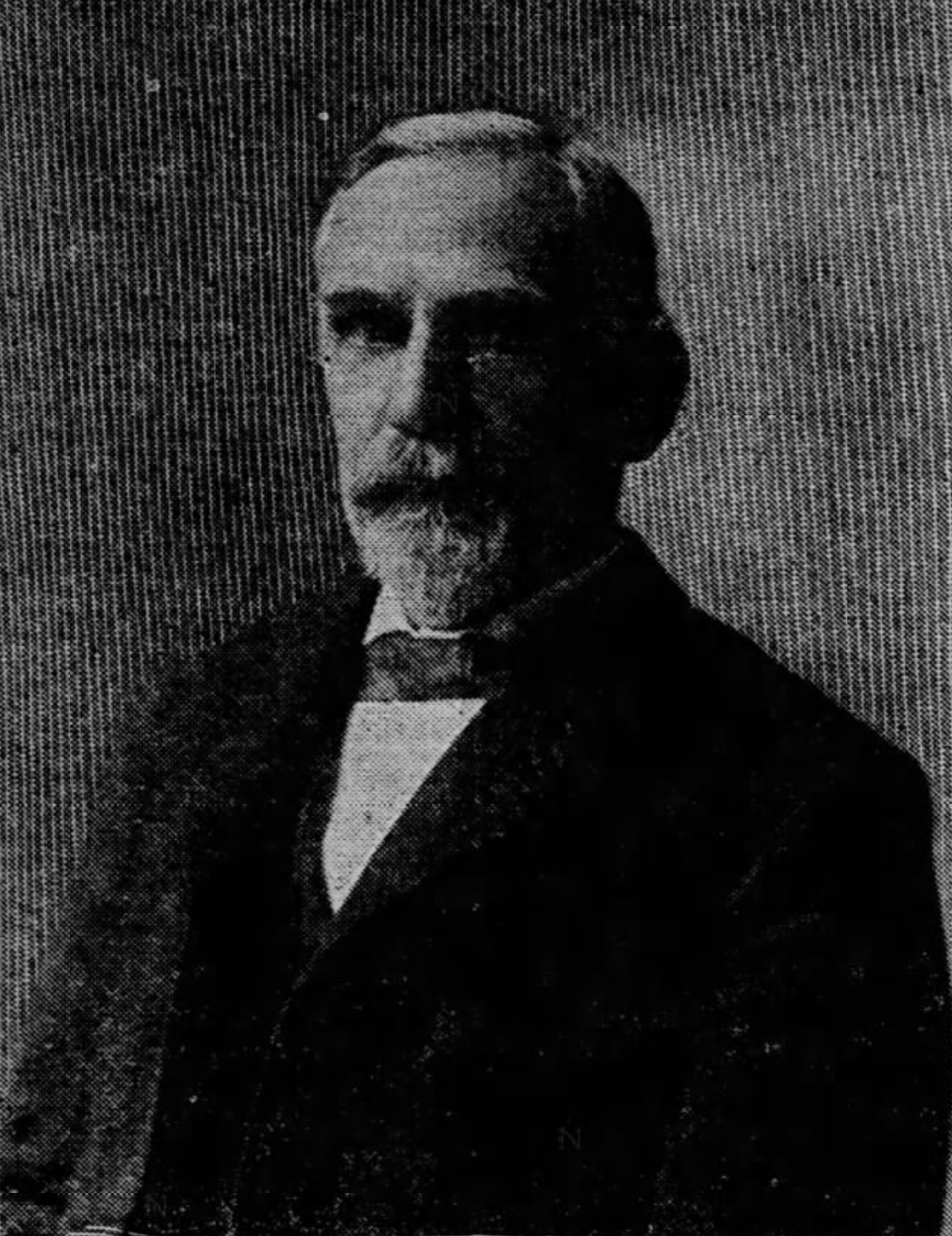
- Pearce, c. 1901

Personal details
- Born: James Alfred Pearce Jr. April 2, 1840 Chestertown, Maryland, U.S.
- Died: December 9, 1920 (aged 80) Chestertown, Maryland, U.S.
- Parent: James Alfred Pearce (father)
- Education: Washington College; Princeton University (Masters, LL.D.)
- Occupation: Lawyer; judge

James Alfred Pearce (April 2, 1840 – December 9, 1920) was an American lawyer, and was a judge of the Maryland Court of Appeals from 1897 to 1912.

== Biography ==
Pearce was born in Chestertown, Maryland, the only son of United States Senator James Alfred Pearce. Pearce attended public school and graduated from Washington College. He graduated from Princeton University in 1860, and thereafter began practicing law in Chestertown. He practiced law for over 30 years before his appointment to the state's highest court in 1897. He retired from the bench in 1912, and died at Chestertown in 1920.
