= Andrew Pierce (disambiguation) =

Andrew Pierce (born 1961) is a British journalist and broadcaster.

Andrew Pierce may also refer to:

- Andrew Pierce (sprinter) (born 1979), American former sprinter
- Andrew Pierce (rugby league) (born 1974), Australian rugby league footballer
- Andrew G. Pierce (1829–1903), American businessman and politician

== See also ==
- Andy Pierce (fl. 1987–2013), frontman of Swedish band Nasty Idols
- Andy Pearce (born 1966), English football defender
