= Steve Piearce =

English footballer

Personal information
- Full name: Stephen Piearce
- Date of birth: 27 September 1974 (age 52)
- Place of birth: Sutton Coldfield, Birmingham, England
- Position: Striker

Youth career
- Wolverhampton Wanderers

Senior career*
Years	Team	Apps	(Gls)
1995–1996	Wolverhampton Wanderers	0	(0)
1995–1996	→ Hednesford Town (loan)	2	(0)
1996–1997	Doncaster Rovers	19	(1)
1997–1999	Halesowen Town	65	(48)
1999–2002	Hereford United	33	(8)
2002–2004	Hednesford Town	39	(20)
- * Club domestic league appearances and goals

Steve Piearce (born 27 September 1974) is an English former footballer who played as a striker. He played in the Football League for Doncaster Rovers.

== Career ==
Piearce began his career as a trainee with Wolverhampton Wanderers, but despite signing professional terms with the club never played a first team match for the club.

He moved to Third Division Doncaster Rovers in Summer 1996 on a free transfer, making his senior debut on 17 August 1996 in a 0–1 loss to Carlisle. The striker made nineteen appearances for the club during the 1996–97 season but only scored once before being released.

After his release from Doncaster, Piearce dropped into non-league football, initially with Halesowen Town.
