= Chris Pearce =

Chris Pearce may refer to:

- Chris Pearce (politician) (born 1963), Australian politician
- Chris Pearce (footballer) (born 1961), Welsh footballer
- Christopher Pearce (cricketer) (born 1984), English cricketer

== See also ==
- Chris Pierce (disambiguation), several people
- Chris Peirce (fl. 1990s), Canadian political candidate
