= James Pearce (American politician) =

American politician (1805–1862)

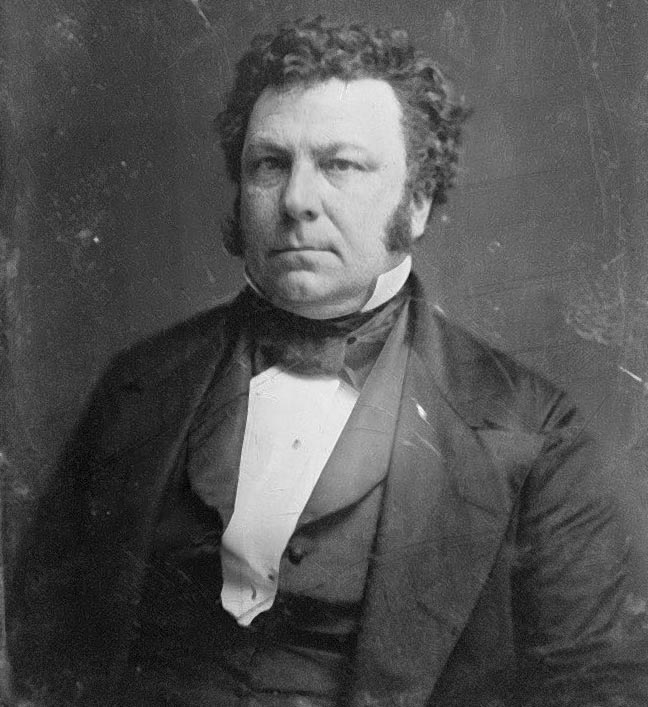
- Pearce c. 1850–1862

United States Senator from Maryland
- In office March 4, 1843 – December 20, 1862
- Preceded by: John L. Kerr
- Succeeded by: Thomas H. Hicks

Member of the U.S. House of Representatives from Maryland's 2nd district
- In office March 4, 1835 – March 3, 1839
- Preceded by: Richard B. Carmichael
- Succeeded by: Philip Thomas
- In office March 4, 1841 – March 3, 1843
- Preceded by: Philip Thomas
- Succeeded by: Francis Brengle

Member of the Maryland House of Delegates
- In office 1831-1835

Personal details
- Born: James Alfred Pearce; December 14, 1805 Alexandria, DC, U.S.
- Died: December 20, 1862 (aged 57) Chestertown, Maryland, U.S.
- Party: Whig, Democrat
- Spouses: Martha J.Laird (m. 1829; died 1845) Matilda Cox Ringgold (m. 1847)
- Children: 4, including James Alfred Pearce Jr.
- Education: College of New Jersey
- Profession: Politician; lawyer

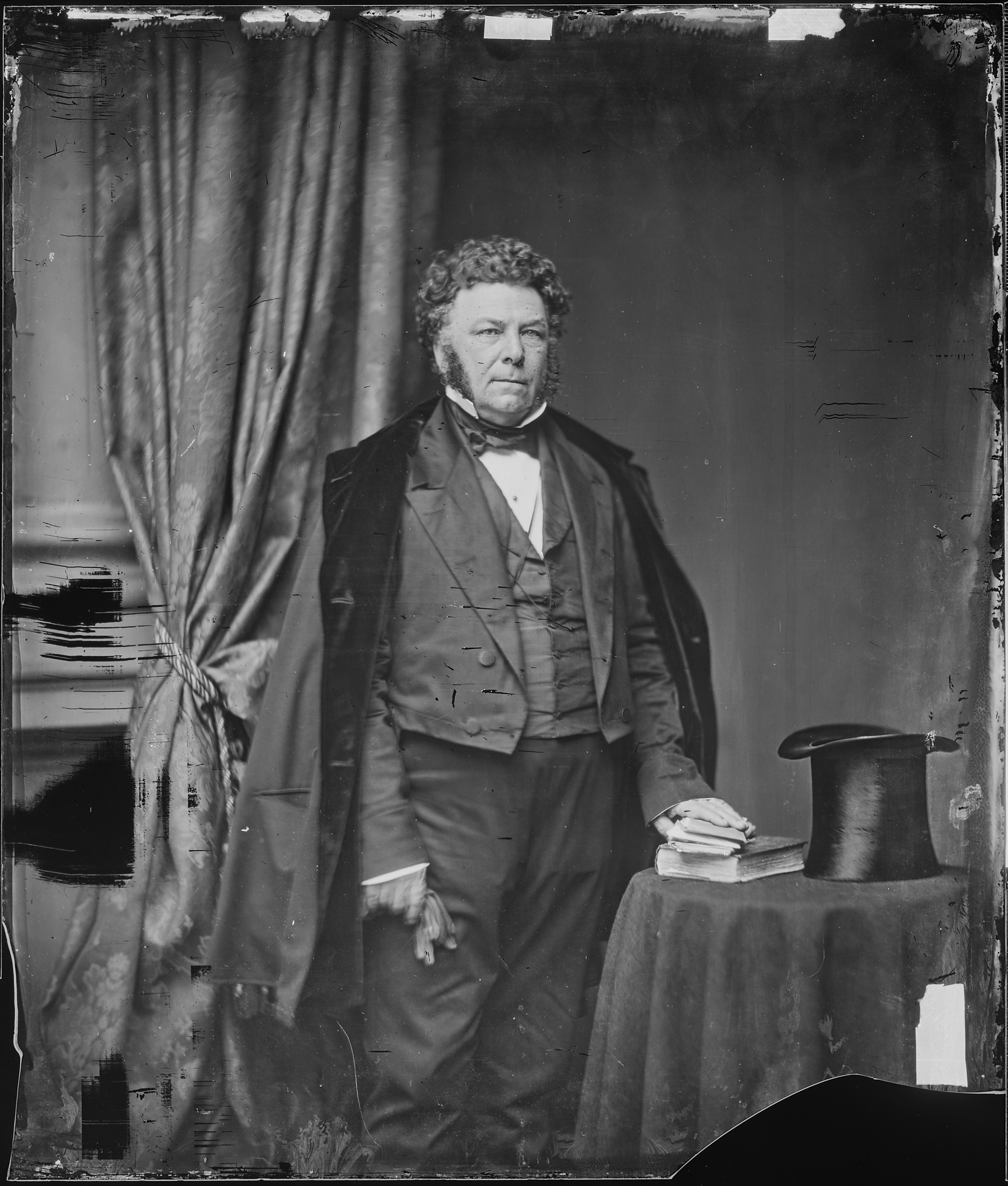
James A. Pearce, photograph by Mathew Brady

James Alfred Pearce (December 14, 1805 – December 20, 1862) was an American politician. He was a member of the U.S. House of Representatives, representing the second district of Maryland from 1835 to 1839 and 1841 to 1843. He later served as a U.S. senator from Maryland from 1843 until his death in 1862.

In 1850, he developed the so-called Pearce Plan, a part of Compromise of 1850. The Pearce Plan provided a solution for the boundary dispute between Texas and the Federal government. Pearce wrote a bill that granted Texas $10 million in compensation for agreeing with the state borders charted by the government. After being approved by Congress, the bill was signed by President Millard Fillmore.

== Biography ==
=== Early life ===
Pearce was in born Alexandria, DC, the son of Gideon Pearce and Julia Dick, and the grandson of Elisha C. Dick. When he turned four years old, his mother died; his father moved to Louisiana to become a sugar planter, leaving his son in Alexandria to the care of grandparents.

Pearce attended a private academy in Alexandria and entered the College of New Jersey (now Princeton University) in 1819. He graduated in 1822 at the age of seventeen with honors and started studying law in Baltimore under Judge John Glenn and attorney David Hoffman (1784–1854), an American legal ethics pioneer and author of Fifty Resolutions in Regard to Professional Deportment (1836). There was a requirement for aspiring jurists set by the Maryland legislature for at least three years of legal studies under the guidance of practicing lawyers (in 1831 it was lowered to two years). Ahead of time, in 1824, Pearce passed exams and was admitted to the Maryland Bar, commencing practice in Cambridge, Maryland for a year. In 1825, Pearce moved with his father in Louisiana, and briefly engaged in sugar planting business, then he returned to Kent County, Maryland, in 1828, where he started the practice of law in Chestertown.

=== Family life ===
In 1829, Pearce married Martha J. Laird; they were raising 3 children in Chestertown, Maryland until 1845, when Martha died. In 1847, Pearce remarried, his new wife became Matilda Cox Ringgold; they had one child. His son, James Alfred Pearce Jr., became a judge for the Maryland Court of Appeals.

=== Political career ===
From 1831 until 1835, Pearce was a member of the Maryland House of Delegates. He was elected as a Whig to the Twenty-fourth and Twenty-fifth Congresses, serving from March 4, 1835, until March 3, 1839, but was an unsuccessful candidate for reelection in 1838 to the Twenty-sixth Congress, losing to Philip Thomas. He was again elected to Congress in 1840, and served one term from March 4, 1841, until March 3, 1843.

Pearce was again elected as a Whig to the United States Senate in 1843, and was re-elected in 1849, 1855, and 1861, the last time as a Democrat, and served from March 4, 1843, until his death in 1862. In the Senate, Pearce served for nineteen years as chairman of the Committee on the Library (Twenty-ninth through Thirty-seventh Congresses). According to Benjamin Perley Poore, Pearce, while "a brilliant conversationalist and a welcome guest at dinner," also "shrank from political controversy," a disposition reflected in his management of the Committee on the Library:

[D]uring his long service on the Committee having it [the Library of Congress] in charge he selected the books purchased. In doing this he excluded all works calculated in his opinion to engender sectional differences, and when the Atlantic Monthly was established he refused to order it for the Library.

Pearce also served in 1861 for two months as chairman of the Committee on Finance. In 1847–1862, he served as a member of the Executive Committee of the Regents of the Smithsonian Institution. He was involved with the United States Coast Survey, which was among the oldest United States Government scientific organizations, and the United States Botanic Garden.

In the U.S. Senate, Pearce became known as an erudite and pragmatist. In 1850, he developed the so-called Pearce Plan, a part of Compromise of 1850. The Pearce Plan provided a solution for the boundary dispute between Texas and the Federal government. Pearce wrote a bill that granted Texas $10 million in compensation for agreeing with the state borders charted by the government. After being approved by Congress, the bill was signed by President Millard Fillmore.

In 1850, President Fillmore offered Pearce, first, to become a judge of the United States District Court for the District of Maryland, and second, to become Secretary of the Interior. Pearce chose to stay in the Senate.

The Whig Party having become fragmented after Henry Clay's death, Pearce joined the Democratic Party in 1856 and supported James Buchanan's nomination for presidency. During the sectional crisis Pearce stood against the dissolution of the Union. However, he was hesitant to discuss the slavery issue being a slaveholder himself. After the Civil War broke out, he did not resign. In March 1862, he appeared in the Senate for the last time.

Pearce died in Chestertown on December 20, 1862, and is interred in New Chester Cemetery. His deathbed from the Hynson-Ringgold House was preserved and now exhibited in the historic Geddes-Piper House (c. 1770) in Chestertown, Maryland.

== See also ==
- List of members of the United States Congress who died in office (1790–1899)

U.S. House of Representatives
Preceded by Richard B. Carmichael	Member of the U.S. House of Representatives from Maryland's 2nd congressional district 1835–1839	Succeeded by Philip Thomas
Preceded by Philip Thomas	Member of the U.S. House of Representatives from Maryland's 2nd congressional district 1841–1843	Succeeded by Francis Brengle
U.S. Senate
Preceded by John L. Kerr	U.S. senator (Class 3) from Maryland; March 4, 1843 – December 20, 1862; Served alongside: William D. Merrick, Reverdy Johnson, David Stewart, Thomas G. Pratt, Anthony Kennedy	Succeeded by Thomas H. Hicks
Political offices
Preceded by Robert M.T. Hunter	Chairman of the Senate Finance Committee; 1861	Succeeded by William Pitt Fessenden
