= Bob Peirce =

British diplomat

Robert "Bob" Nigel Peirce is a British-American former diplomat, international policing consultant and author. Until July 2009 he was a British diplomat, serving as British Consul-General in Los Angeles. A former secretary for external affairs in the Hong Kong Government, he was a key negotiator with China on Hong Kong from the early 1980s through the handover in June 1997.

Under the chairmanship of Christopher Patten, Peirce guided the work of the Independent Commission on Policing for Northern Ireland, whose seminal report provided a vital foundation for peace in Northern Ireland. He has also worked closely with the Police Executive Research Forum (PERF) to develop links between the UK and US on all aspects of policing policy.

In his capacity as Consul-General in Los Angeles, he facilitated the first-ever visit by a serving British Prime Minister to California and strengthened UK-CA cultural and business relations through the creation of BritWeek. He has served as private secretary to three British Foreign Secretaries: Sir Geoffrey Howe, Sir John Major, and Douglas Hurd.

== Biodata ==
Peirce (born 18 March 1955) was raised in Somerset, England, where he attended Taunton School., and in South Africa. He was educated at St Catherine's College, Oxford, where he obtained a MA in Modern History, and also studied Chinese at Cambridge University. His parents were Kenneth and Margaret Peirce.

== Foreign Office career ==
After joining the Foreign & Commonwealth Office (FCO) in 1977, Bob worked in a number of key positions. He served in Hong Kong (from 1979 to 1980, then as Deputy Political Advisor from 1986 to 1989 and finally as Political Advisor to the Governor from 1993 to 1997), in Peking (1980–83), at the FCO in London (1983–85), and in the Cabinet Office (1985–86). He was Private Secretary to three Secretaries of State for Foreign & Commonwealth Affairs between 1988 and 1990. He served at the UK Mission to the UN from 1990 to 1993, where his work focused on Security Council issues, including Namibia, Cambodia, South Africa, Angola, Yugoslavia, Cyprus and many others.

In 1990, he was engaged by the UK's Overseas Development Administration (the predecessor to the Department for International Development) to serve as a consultant to the President of Uganda, Yoweri Museveni, on the organisation of the Ugandan State House bureaucracy. Bob was posted to the Royal College of Defence Studies in 1998 until becoming Secretary of the Independent Commission on Policing for Northern Ireland later that year. He left the Commission in 1999 and became Counselor (Press & Public Affairs) at the British Embassy in Washington, D.C. In 2005, he was appointed Consul-General in Los Angeles, with responsibility for a geographical region with a larger population than many countries.

== Hong Kong ==
Bob was twice a member of the Government of Hong Kong, in the 1980s and again in the 1990s. From 1993 to 1997, he was the Secretary responsible for Hong Kong's external affairs under Governor Christopher Patten. For most of the period from 1979 to 1997, he was directly involved in the negotiations that culminated in the handover of Hong Kong to the People's Republic of China on 30 June 1997, as documented in Patten's books, East and West and The Hong Kong Diaries and other writings on the subject.

== The Patten Commission ==
Bob was the Secretary (equivalent to chief executive) of the Independent Commission on Policing for Northern Ireland, established 3 June 1998 under the chairmanship Chris Patten. The commission's report A New Beginning: Policing in Northern Ireland, released in 1999, was drafted by Bob and formed the basis of policing reforms in Northern Ireland following the 1998 peace agreement. It has been hailed by policing experts around the world as a seminal document for policing in a democratic society as well as a template for policing in divided societies.

== Policing policy ==
When serving as head of political and public affairs at the British Embassy in Washington, DC, Bob worked closely with Chuck Wexler, Executive Director of the Police Executive Research Forum (PERF), to develop links between UK and US police departments, resulting in best practice exchanges on all aspects of related policy, from forensic DNA to public order policing. Peirce has worked as a consultant on policing reforms in various countries in Asia, Europe and Latin America, as well as in the United States. In 2017–18, he worked with the Commission on the Future of Policing in Ireland, chaired by Kathleen O'Toole, and drafted the report of that commission, which has been the basis of policing reforms in that country. In 2022, he and O'Toole published the highly acclaimed book Seven Ways to Fix Policing NOW, a response to the crisis in policing in the United States and elsewhere.

== California ==
Visit by Prime Minister Tony Blair In August 2006, Bob facilitated the visit by Prime Minister Tony Blair to California — the first ever visit to the state by a serving British Prime Minister. As part of the visit, Bob instigated the creation of a ground-breaking climate change pact between California and the United Kingdom. The pact was signed by Blair and California Governor Arnold Schwarzenegger after their participation in a climate change round table with business leaders in Long Beach. The unprecedented agreement between a country and a US state affirms that the UK and California will work together to evaluate and implement market-based mechanisms that spur innovation, share best practices, deepen their understanding of the economics of climate change, collaborate on technology research, and enhance linkages between their scientific communities.

BritWeek Together with Nigel Lythgoe, President of 19 Entertainment and Executive Producer of American Idol, Bob introduced BritWeek to Los Angeles, an annual week of events and celebrations whose collective aim is to strengthen and broaden awareness of the creative, cultural and trade links between Britain and Los Angeles. A promotional film for BritWeek 2008, features Bob, Nigel Lythgoe, Simon Cowell of American Idol, and a number of other prominent Brits commenting on the influence the UK has had on Los Angeles and vice versa, not least in the entertainment arena. Bob continues to chair Brit Week, which is being extended to include San Francisco in 2010.

== Personal life ==
Peirce is married to Sharon Harroun Peirce, a native of Virginia who has worked extensively with international humanitarian organizations promoting peace in Northern Ireland, including the Children's Friendship Project for Northern Ireland, Inc. (CFPNI) and several other non-profit organizations. They are based in Northern Virginia. Together, they have three children from different marriages.

== Links ==
- Who's Who reference guide
- BBC article – California and UK in climate pact
- California Office of the Governor press release on UK-CA Agreement
- Official biography on www.BritainUSA.com
- Telegraph article about BritWeek 2008
- Marshall Scholars Meet Tony Blair during California visit
- BritWeek 2008 promotional video
