= Frank Pierce (athlete) =

American track and field athlete

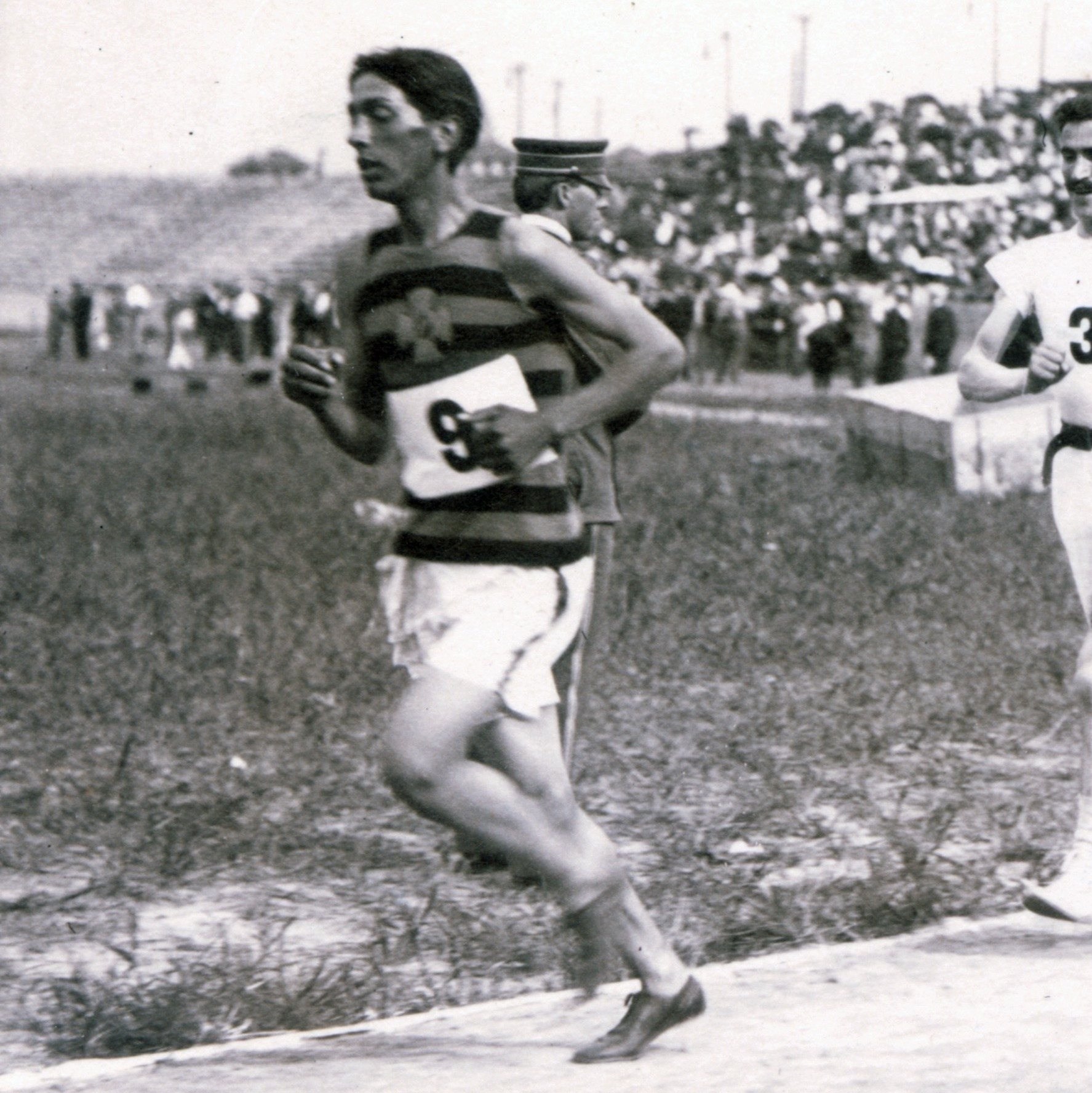
- Frank Pierce,1904

Personal information
- Nationality: Native American
- Born: April 1883
- Died: February 25, 1908 (aged 24)

Sport
- Sport: Long-distance running
- Event: Marathon

Frank C. Pierce (April 1883 – February 25, 1908) was an American track and field athlete from the Seneca Nation who competed in the 1904 Summer Olympics. In 1904 he did not finish in marathon competition. However, competing made him the first Native American to compete for the United States in the Olympic Games.
