= Boer settlement in New Mexico =

Early 20th century South African refugee settlements in southwestern United States

South African Boer refugees established agricultural colonies in the southwestern United States, primarily in the Mesilla Valley region of New Mexico Territory, during the early 20th century. These settlements were established by veterans and refugees from the Second Boer War (1899–1902) who chose exile rather than to live under British rule.

== Background ==
Following the defeat of the Boer republics (the Orange Free State and the Transvaal) in the Second Boer War, many Boers refused to sign oaths of allegiance to the British Crown. These "irreconcilables" sought new homes abroad, with significant support from American sympathizers who viewed the Boers' struggle as similar to America's own revolution against British rule.

The United States saw substantial pro-Boer sentiment during and after the war. Several states, including Texas, Arkansas, Colorado, and seven other western states, offered free land to Boer refugees. Representative John J. Fitzgerald of New York even proposed in June 1900 that all Boers be invited to settle on government land in the United States.

== Hacienda Humboldt Colony ==
Before establishing settlements in New Mexico, a group of South African refugee officers formed a farm colony in Mexico with the assistance of President Theodore Roosevelt. The colony was located at Hacienda Humboldt in the municipality of Julimes, Chihuahua. The land, which had previously belonged to Luis Terrazas, was purchased with help from two men hired by Roosevelt: Marshall Latham Bond and Edward Reeve Merritt.

Roosevelt, himself from a Dutch puritan family, met with Wilhelm Snyman and other Boer leaders in April 1901 at his home on Long Island, New York. Unable to provide official assistance without antagonizing the British, Roosevelt worked behind the scenes, contacting Porfirio Díaz about resettlement and arranging for the South Africans to meet with Mexican Secretary of the Treasury José Yves Limantour. After touring several sites by Pullman coach on a government train, the Boers selected 33,615 square hectares of the ex-Hacienda de Santa Rosalia near Camargo, Chihuahua, for fifty thousand pesos.

To raise funds for the colony, Roosevelt helped ensure that Ben Viljoen's books My Reminiscences of the Anglo-Boer War and An Exiled General received respectable reviews and decent sales. Additionally, Viljoen and several other South Africans mounted the "Boer War Circus" at the 1904 Saint Louis Exhibition to raise the necessary funds.

The Mexican colony never particularly thrived. Beginning in 1908, the Humboldt colonists started emigrating to more active Mexican towns like Ciudad de Chihuahua and farming areas like the Mesilla Valley in New Mexico near El Paso, Texas. Boers who remained in Mexico either married into local families or moved away, resulting in the loss of the community's Boer identity by the mid-1930s.

== See also ==
- Second Boer War
- Ben Viljoen
- Mesilla Valley
- Theodore Roosevelt
- Hacienda Humboldt
