= Edwin Coupland Shaw =

American Industrialist (1863-1941)

- Born: 1863; Ohio, United States
- Died: 1941 (aged 77–78)
- Education: Sheffield Scientific School at Yale University
- Occupation: Industrialist
- Known for: Founding Akron Community Foundation
- Spouse: Jennifer Bond Shaw

Edwin Coupland Shaw (1863–1941) was an American industrialist and philanthropist based in Akron, Ohio. He developed the rubber industry in Akron, but was best known for founding the Akron Community Foundation which together with his wife supported health, educational, cultural, art and welfare in the area.

== Career ==
As an engineer, Shaw had a great hand in the mechanical and engineering development of the rubber industry in Akron. He studied at Sheffield Scientific School at Yale University and was later employed at B.F. Goodrich Co. for many years, working his way up to become vice president of factory operations.

== Philanthropy ==
Shaw and his wife, Jennifer Bond Shaw, were also highly respected philanthropists in Akron. In 1934, Summit County commissioners changed the name of the Springfield Lake Sanatorium to the Edwin C. Shaw Sanatorium because of his work for the benefit of the tuberculosis hospital, which is now known as the Edwin Shaw Hospital for Rehabilitation. It has since become a rehabilitation center at Akron General Health System for patients with strokes, spinal cord injuries and other serious conditions. Shaw and his wife also organized the Akron Institute of Art, now known as the Akron Art Museum.

However, Shaw is arguably best known for founding Akron Community Foundation with a bequest of more than $1 million in 1955. Formerly known as Akron Community Trusts, the organization was incorporated in 1955 under the laws of Ohio to permanently serve the health, educational, cultural and welfare needs primarily, but not exclusively, of Summit County, Ohio.

In his will drawn up in 1934, Shaw expressed his desire to provide a means for residents to make charitable gifts with a flexibility of purpose “to meet the changes in the community needs wrought by the passage of time and the variance in circumstances.” Shaw’s initial gift of $1,033,533 was soon followed by gifts and bequests from many other civic-minded citizens who wished to enjoy sound and faithful administration of their philanthropic plans.

== Final years ==
In 1936, Shaw was injured in a fall during a fishing trip in Michigan. From then on, he was forced to carry on his crusade for a better community from his bed, where he remained until his death in 1941.

== See also ==
- Hiram Bond, Jennifer Bond Shaw's uncle
- Louis Whitford Bond, Hiram's son
- Marshall Latham Bond, Hiram's son
