= Mexico–South Africa relations =

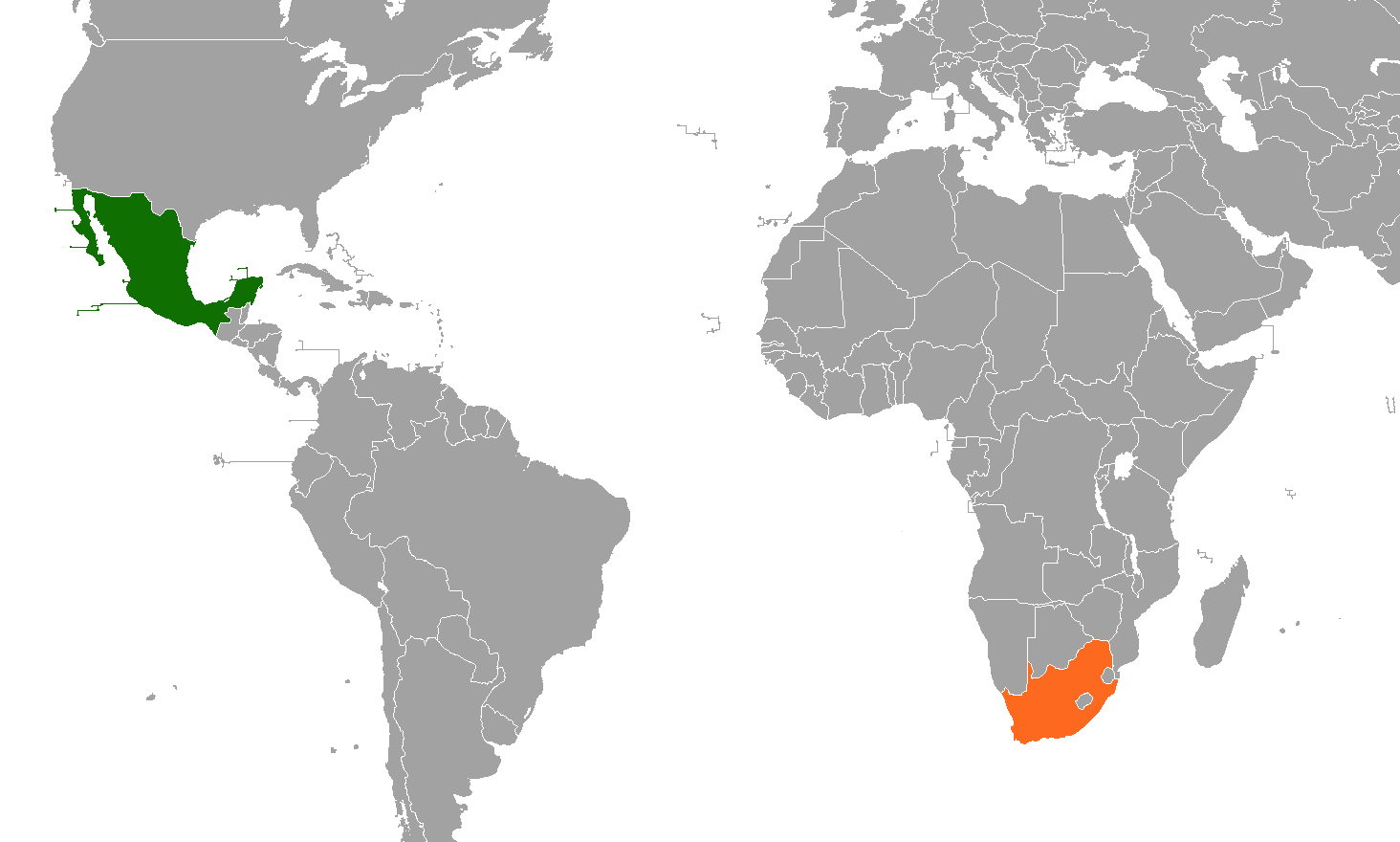

- Mexico: South Africa

The nations of Mexico and South Africa established diplomatic relations in 1993. Bilateral relations between both nations have been characterized by a good level of political dialogue and by the mutual recognition of the leadership and involvement exercised by both countries in their respective regions.

Both nations are members of the G-20 major economies, Group of 24 and the United Nations.

== History ==
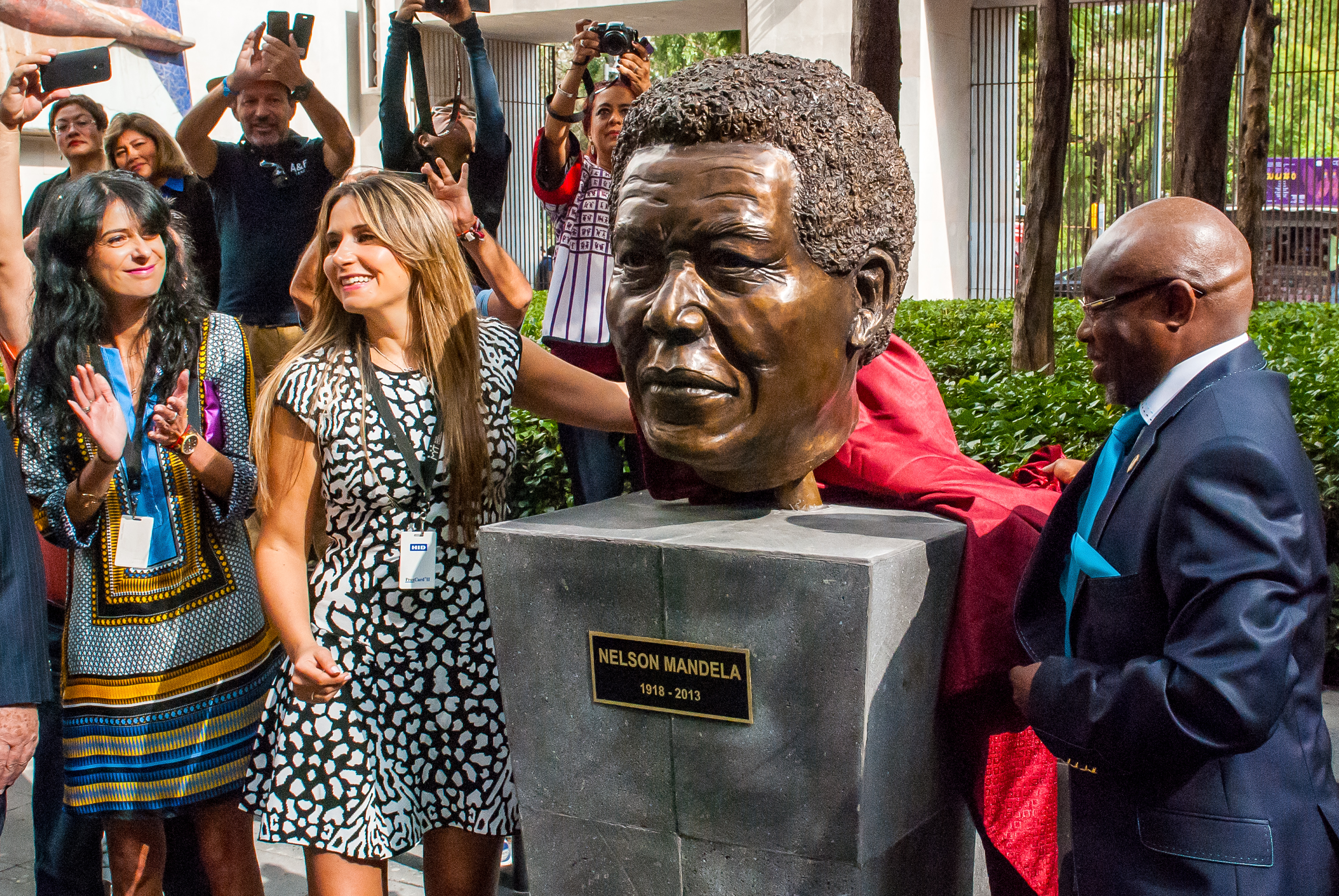
Unveiling of a bust of Nelson Mandela at the Memory and Tolerance Museum in Mexico City, 2014.

After the Second Boer War, in 1903 approximately 37 Afrikaner families migrated to the Mexican Northern State of Chihuahua, with one of them being Ben Viljoen where he lived at Hacienda Humboldt for a time. Viljoen would later fight alongside Mexican President Francisco I. Madero during the Mexican Revolution.

After the establishment of the Union of South Africa, Mexico opened an honorary consulate in Cape Town in 1932. Beginning with the official implementation of Apartheid by the South African government, Mexico vehemently opposed South Africa's apartheid policy at the United Nations. Mexico also opposed South Africa's involvement and military interventions in Angola, Namibia and in Rhodesia (present-day Zimbabwe). In 1968, South Africa was not invited to participate in the Summer Olympics held in Mexico City.

In 1974, Mexico closed its honorary consulate in Cape Town. In 1976, Mexico ratified the International Convention on the Elimination of All Forms of Racial Discrimination which implied the commitment not to maintain economic, financial, commercial, sports and touristic relations with South Africa.

From 1980–1981, Mexico was non-permanent member in the United Nations Security Council. While on the council, Mexico voted in favor of United Nations Security Council Resolution 475 condemning the continuing attacks on Angola by South Africa through occupied South West Africa (present-day Namibia). In 1985, during a UN meeting for Namibia in Vienna, Mexico called for full-sanctions against the South African government.

In 1991, Nelson Mandela, head of the African National Congress, visited Mexico during his tour of Latin-American nations. During his visit, Mandela met with President Carlos Salinas de Gortari.

On 27 October 1993 both nations formally established diplomatic relations. In 1994 both nations established a diplomatic mission in each other's capital's, respectively. In 1999, Mexican Foreign Secretary Rosario Green traveled to South Africa to attend the inauguration of President Thabo Mbeki.

In 2002, President Mbeki paid a visit to Mexico to attend the Monterrey Consensus and met with President Vicente Fox. That same year, President Fox paid a visit to South Africa. In June 2010, Mexican President Felipe Calderón paid a visit to South Africa to attend the 2010 FIFA World Cup and met with President Jacob Zuma. In November 2010, President Zuma paid a visit to Mexico to attend the 2010 United Nations Climate Change Conference in Cancún. In 2012, President Zuma paid a second visit to Mexico to attend the G20 Summit in Los Cabos.

In December 2013, Mexican President Enrique Peña Nieto visited South Africa to attend the funeral for Nelson Mandela. In 2015, South African Deputy President Cyril Ramaphosa paid a visit to Mexico to attend the Open Government Partnership Summit. While in Mexico, Ramaphosa paid a visit to President Peña Nieto and discussed the consolidation of bilateral political, economic and trade relations between the two countries.

In August 2023, South African Deputy Foreign Minister Alvin Botes paid a visit to Mexico to attend the 3rd Meeting of the Consultation Mechanism on Matters of Mutual Interests between both nations cohosted with his counterpart Carmen Moreno Toscano. That same year, both nations celebrated 30 years of diplomatic relations.

== High-level visits ==
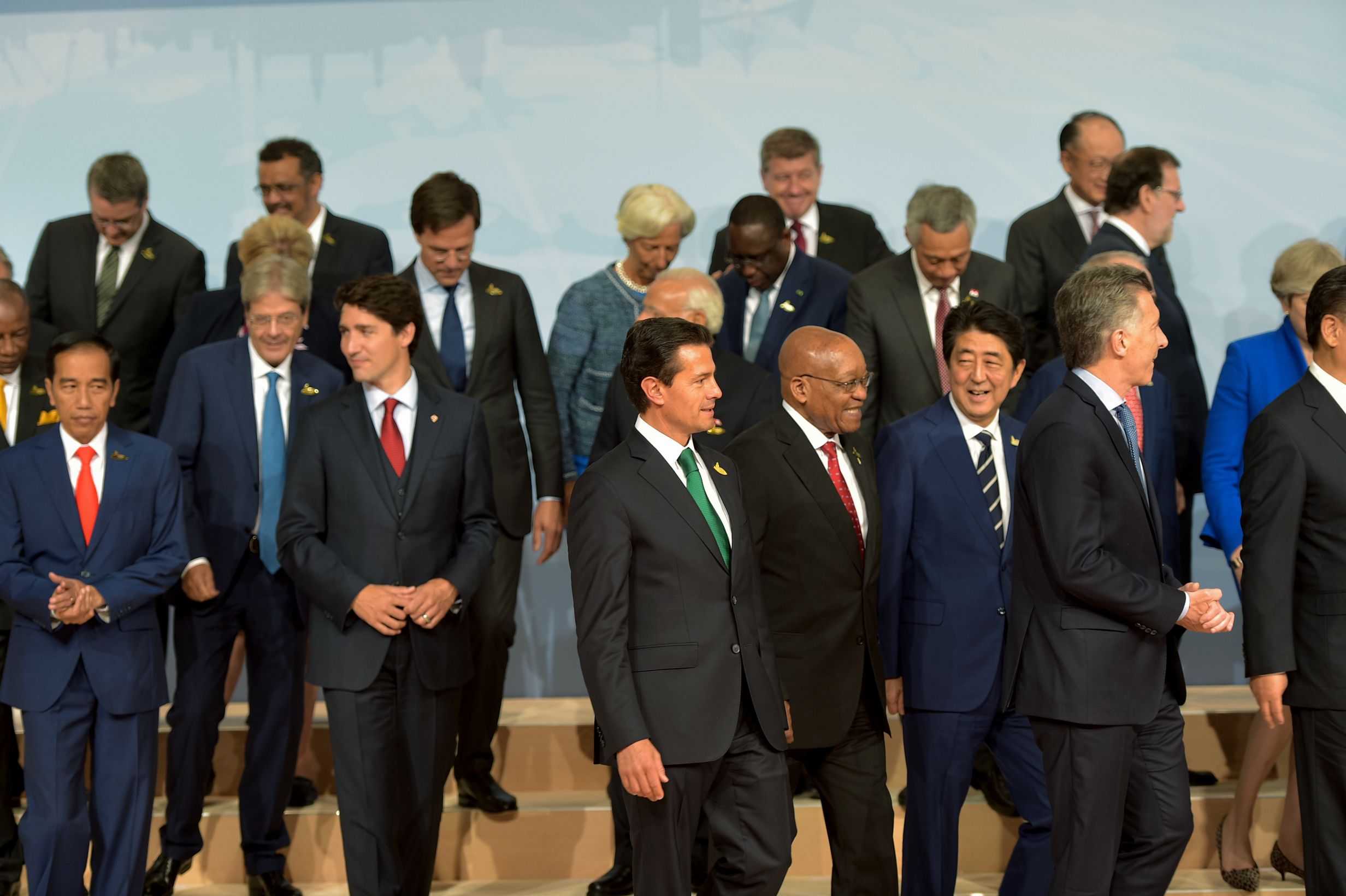
President Enrique Peña Nieto and President Jacob Zuma at the G20 Summit in Hamburg, Germany; July 2017.

High-level visits from Mexico to South Africa

- Foreign Undersecretary Carmen Moreno Toscano (1998)
- Foreign Secretary Rosario Green (1999)
- President Vicente Fox (2002)
- Foreign Secretary Patricia Espinosa (2009)
- President Felipe Calderón (2010)
- President Enrique Peña Nieto (2013)
- Foreign Secretary José Antonio Meade (2017)
- Foreign Undersecretary Julián Ventura Valero (2019)
- Secretary of Finance Edgar Amador Zamora (2025)

High-level visits from South Africa to Mexico

- Head of the African National Congress Nelson Mandela (1991)
- President Thabo Mbeki (2002)
- Deputy President Phumzile Mlambo-Ngcuka (2008)
- President Jacob Zuma (2010, 2012)
- Foreign Minister Maite Nkoana-Mashabane (2010)
- Deputy President Cyril Ramaphosa (2015)
- Deputy Foreign Minister Alvin Botes (2023)
- Foreign Minister Ronald Lamola (2026)

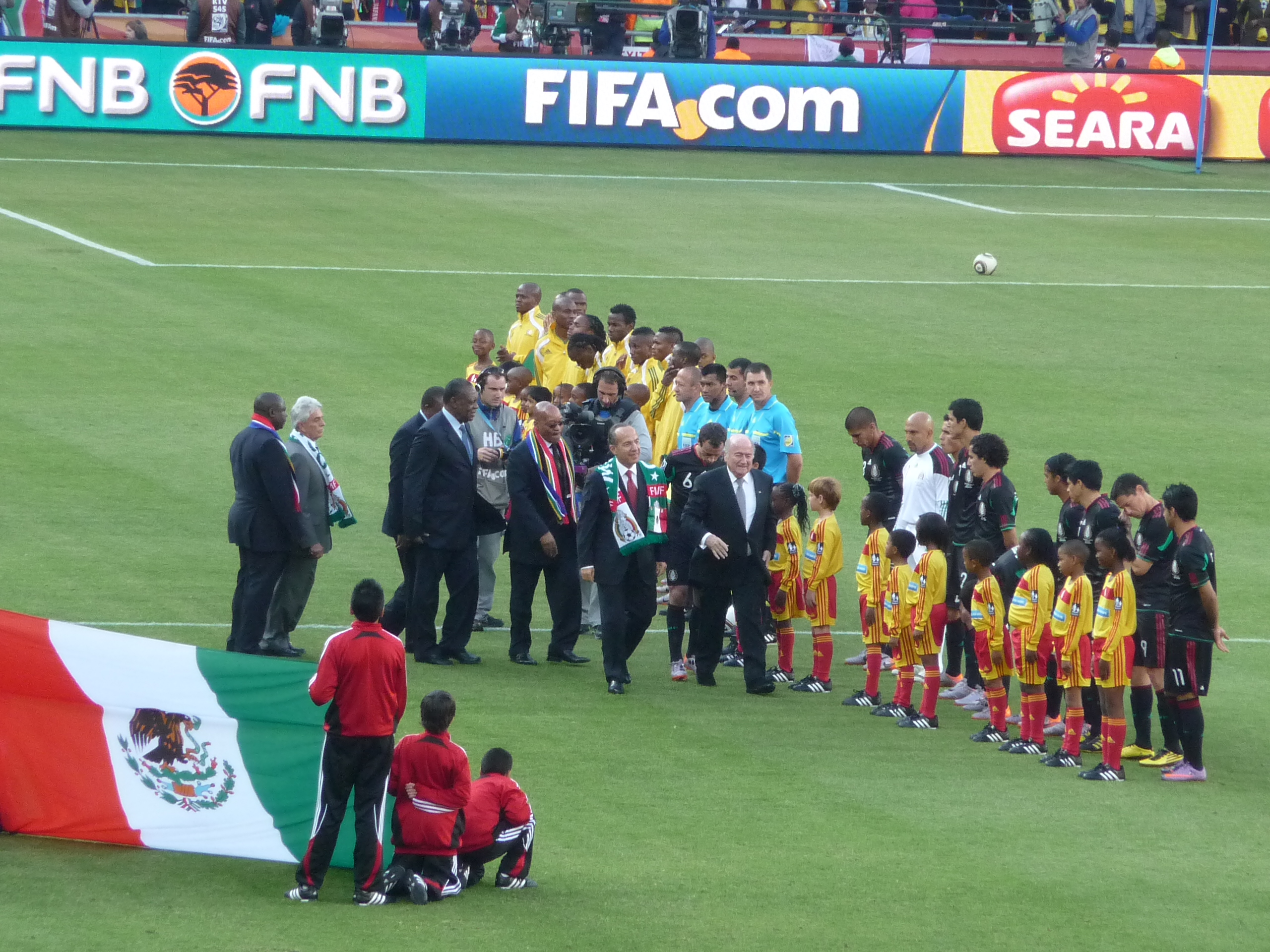
Presidents Jacob Zuma and Felipe Calderón attending the FIFA World Cup in Johannesburg; June 2010.

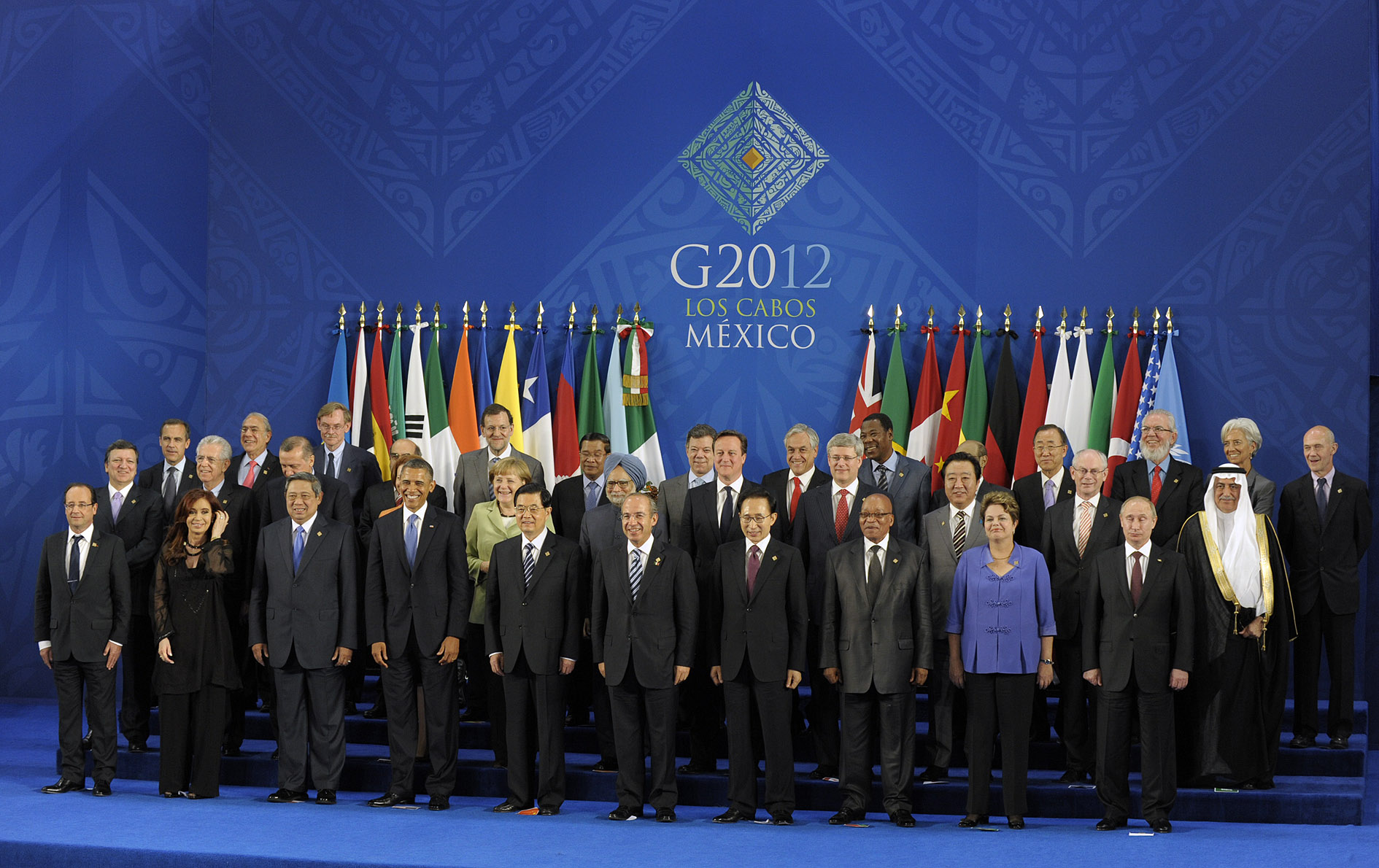
President Felipe Calderón and President Jacob Zuma at the G20 Summit in Los Cabos, Mexico; June 2012.

== Bilateral agreements ==
Both nations have signed several bilateral agreements such as a General Cooperation Agreement (1998); Memorandum of Understanding for the Establishment of a Consultation Mechanism on Matters of Mutual Interest (2001); Agreement on Cultural Cooperation (2004); Technical Cooperation Agreement on Social Development (2006); Agreement for Cooperation and Conservation of Species between Mexico City's Chapultepec Zoo and Pretoria Zoo (2007); Agreement for the Avoidance of Double Taxation and Prevention of Fiscal Evasion (2009); Memorandum of Understanding for the Establishment of a Binational Commission (2009); Agreement on Scientific and Technological Cooperation (2011); Memorandum of Understanding for the Establishment of a Mechanism of Consultation in Matters of Mutual Interest (2011); Extradition Treaty (2014); Treaty on Mutual Legal Assistance in Criminal Matters (2013); Memorandum of Understanding on Tourism Cooperation between the Secretariat of Tourism of Mexico and the Department of Tourism of South Africa (2014); Memorandum of Understanding between Bancomext of Mexico and the Export Credit Insurance Corporation of South Africa (2014); Memorandum of Understanding on Air Services (2016); and an Agreement of Cooperation between Mexico's National Autonomous University of Mexico and South Africa's University of the Witwatersrand for the creation of a Centre for Mexican Studies at the University of Witwatersrand (2017).

== Trade relations ==
In 2023, trade between the two nations amounted to US$1.2 billion. Mexico's main exports to South Africa include: telephones and mobile phones, data processing machines, machinery for agriculture, parts and accessories for motor vehicles, chemical based products, rubber tires, tools, medical appliances, fish, pepper and alcohol. South Africa's main exports to Mexico include: unwrought aluminum and nickel, motor vehicles for the transport of goods, machinery and mechanical appliances, minerals, chemical based products, paper, hides, corn, seeds, fruits and nuts.

Mexican multinational companies such as Cosmocel, Grupo Bimbo, Gruma and KidZania (among others) operate in South Africa. South African multinational companies such as Aspen Pharmacare, Dimension Data, Master Drilling, Naspers and Sappi; operate in Mexico.

== Resident diplomatic missions ==
- Mexico has an embassy in Pretoria.
- South Africa has an embassy in Mexico City.

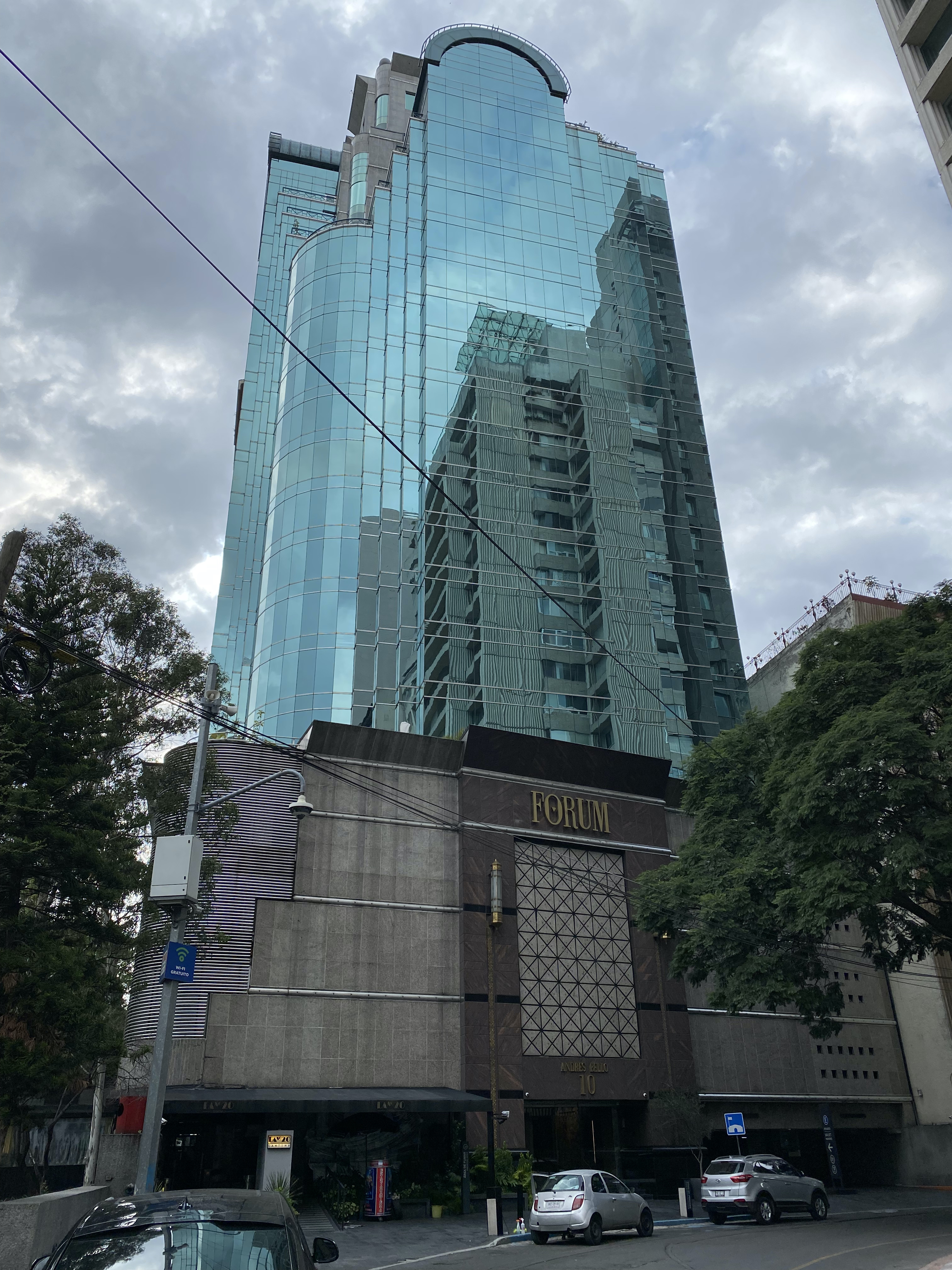
Building hosting the Embassy of South Africa in Mexico City

== See also ==
- Apartheid-era South Africa and the Olympics
- Foreign relations of Mexico
- Foreign relations of South Africa
- Hacienda Humboldt
