= General Viljoen =

General Viljoen may refer to:

- Barend Viljoen (1908–1995), South African Air Force major general
- Ben Viljoen (1869–1917), South African Republic general
- Constand Viljoen (1933–2020), South African Army general
