= Colonia San José, Chihuahua =

Communal landholding in Chihuahua, Mexico

Colonia San Jose Chihuahua is an ejido in the municipality of Julimes, in the northern Mexican state of Chihuahua.
