= James Pieronnet Pierce =

James Pieronnet Pierce (c. August 25, 1825 – 1897) was an American entrepreneur and early California pioneer.

== Early life ==
James P. Pierce was born August 25, 1825 in Friendsville, Pennsylvania where he spent his early life, before moving west as a young adult. In Constantine, Michigan, he embarked on a career in General Merchandising. There he met Amelia Ann Pease, a native of Ann Arbor. The couple married on August 25, 1852, in Jackson, Michigan, when Pierce was twenty-seven and Pease was seventeen.

Two years later, in 1854, they came to California, reaching San Francisco, California by way of the Isthmus. Shortly after their arrival, they went to Yuba County, and at Smartsville, California Mr. Pierce engaged in hydraulic mining, becoming a leading operator before he sold out in 1878.

== San Francisco sea wall ==
He might have continued uninterruptedly in that important field, had not the death of a brother-in-law, A. H. Houston, drawn him back to San Francisco to take charge of an entirely different enterprise. Mr. Houston, as early as 1867, had undertaken to build part of the seawall along the San Francisco waterfront, under contract with the board of state harbor commissioners, and when he died he had finished only a part of that great undertaking and had gone to great expense in quarrying and cutting granite. Mr. Pierce succeeded to Mr. Houston’s interests and completed 1130 feet of the new sea wall under a new and enlarged contract, receiving as his compensation $240 per linear foot.

== Mining interests ==
From 1868, for seven or eight years, Mr. Pierce’s family lived in San Francisco, and during that time he established general offices there, although his main interests continued to be the exploitation of hydraulic mining properties in Yuba County, which he still operated for many years after finishing the sea wall. He continued to own and operate the Blue Gravel Mine, which was enlarged to include a water proposition and a large lot of land, and renamed it The Excelsior Water and Mining Company, under which title it was conducted until sold in 1881 to a syndicate composed of James Ben Ali Haggin & Lloyd Tevis, and others. His interest in this deal amounted to $600,000.

== New Park Estate, Santa Clara ==
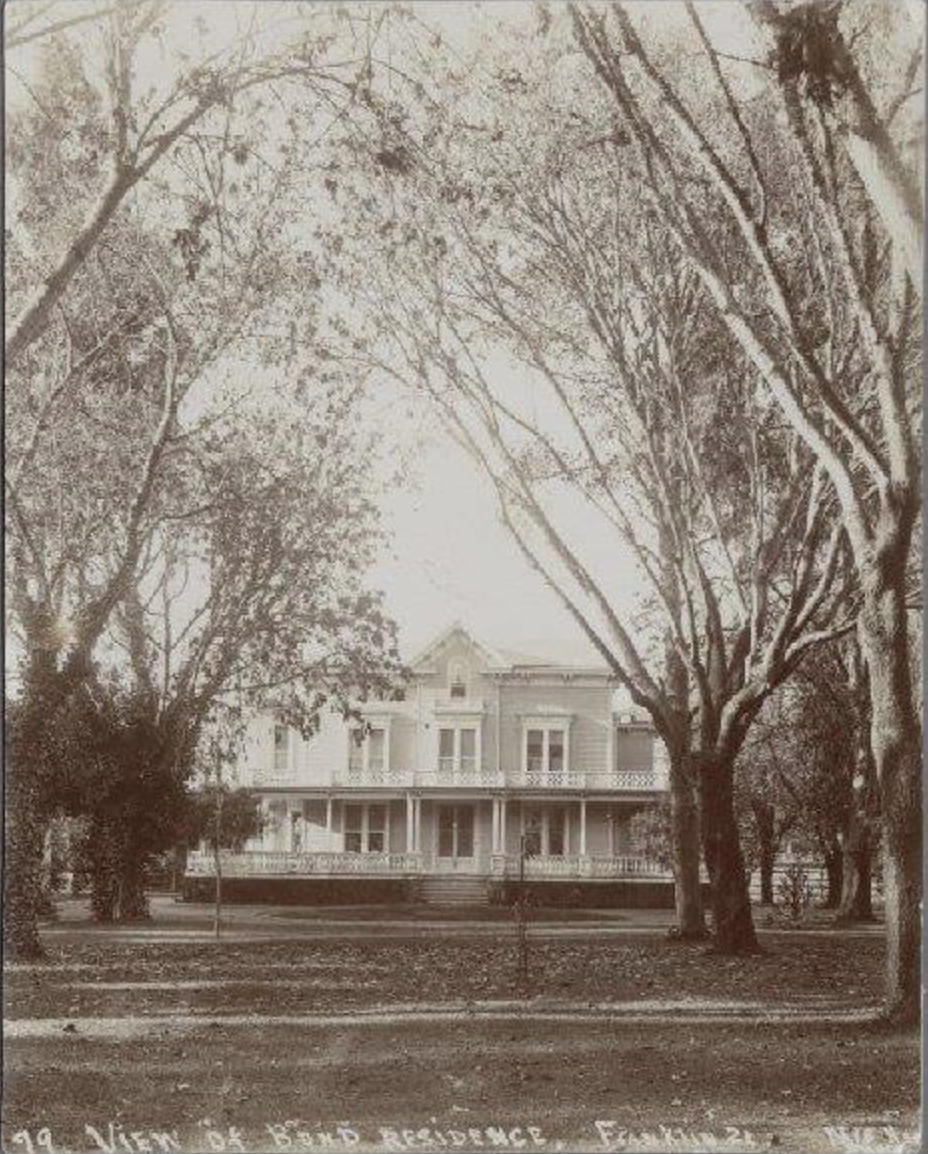
New Park Estate (c. 1898), Santa Clara, California

In 1866, he purchased from Mr. Lent a very beautiful country home, occupying eighty-eight acres on the west side of Santa Clara, California naming the place “New Park,” after the country home of his grandfather in England. The price paid to Mr. Lent was $48,500, a very large sum for those days. It abutted Franklin Street and included what is now the country home of R.T. Pierce. Pierce had the property managed for a period of this time by Harry Pickstone an Englishman who later migrated to South Africa where he engaged at Boschendal in the fruit business with Cecil Rhodes. It also included New Park House a fruit orchard nursery, a vineyard and winery, servant's quarters, pasture, and stables.

Upon his death, this property was sold to Judge Hiram Bond who continued to operate it. After Judge Bond's death, the property was sold to senator James D. Phelan who constructed a Discalced Carmelite nunnery, which is still there as of 2025. The winery operation was sold to a family of British immigrants named the Braces. While they were living there the Bonds hosted the author Jack London who had been their tenant handyman during the 1897 and 1898 Klondike Gold Rush. London used the estate as the opening scene of the novel The Call of the Wild.

== Pacific Manufacturing Co. ==
In 1877 Mr. Pierce bought a small planing mill in Santa Clara and changed its name from Enterprise Mill to the Pacific Manufacturing Company, and incorporated it in 1879. He purchased some timber lands in the Santa Cruz Mountains and built a sawmill at Ben Lomond, California, and put in the first band saw to be operated in California. Mr. Pierce at one time owned the Empire Gold Mine in Grass Valley, California which he sold in 1872 to the father of W.B. Bourn for $150,000. This mine was developed by the Bourns into one of the largest and most profitable in the state. Soon after organizing the Pacific Manufacturing Company, Mr. Pierce became quite active as a lumberman and in addition to the Ben Lomond Mill, he purchased timber lands and built a sawmill at Ash Creek at the foot of Mount Shasta. At this time he was a pioneer in the sugar and white pine industry. He founded the Bank of Santa Clara County and erected the building that it occupied on the corner of Main and Franklin streets. He served as a trustee of Mills Seminary, afterward Mills College, for many years, devoting a great deal of time to its interests and making it many gifts.A
