= La Regina =

Coordinates: 28.4136°N 105.4516°W

La Regina is an ejido located in the municipality of Julimes, in the northern Mexican state of Chihuahua.
