= California Cured Fruit Association =

The California Cured Fruit Association was formed by plum growers in the Santa Clara Valley, the country's largest center of production, in 1900 to handle distribution of the dried fruit. There were well over three thousand members, which included farmers in other parts of the state.

The driving force in the association was its President Hiram Bond who with his brother Elmer Monroe Bond, a New York produce dealer, owned a plum nursery, vineyard and winery in Santa Clara, California.

There were wide swings in the price of prunes depending on time from the harvest. In 1901, the Association built a large dried fruit warehouse near Santa Clara's railroad station. The Cured Fruit Association disbanded in 1903. That year there was an unusually successful plum crop too large to be processed or stored in the association's warehouses. Farmers who were faced with rotting fruit sold outside of their agreement at less than the association approved price. A group of dissident members managed to obtain a majority and had the organization disbanded.

In 1916, Rosenberg Brothers took over the warehouse for its dried prune and apricot operation. Many of the farmers involved were later active in the California Prune Board which in 2000 became the California Dried Plum Board. In 2019 a decision reverted the name of the organization.
