= Mayhurst =

Historic house in Virginia, United States

- U.S. National Register of Historic Places
- Virginia Landmarks Register
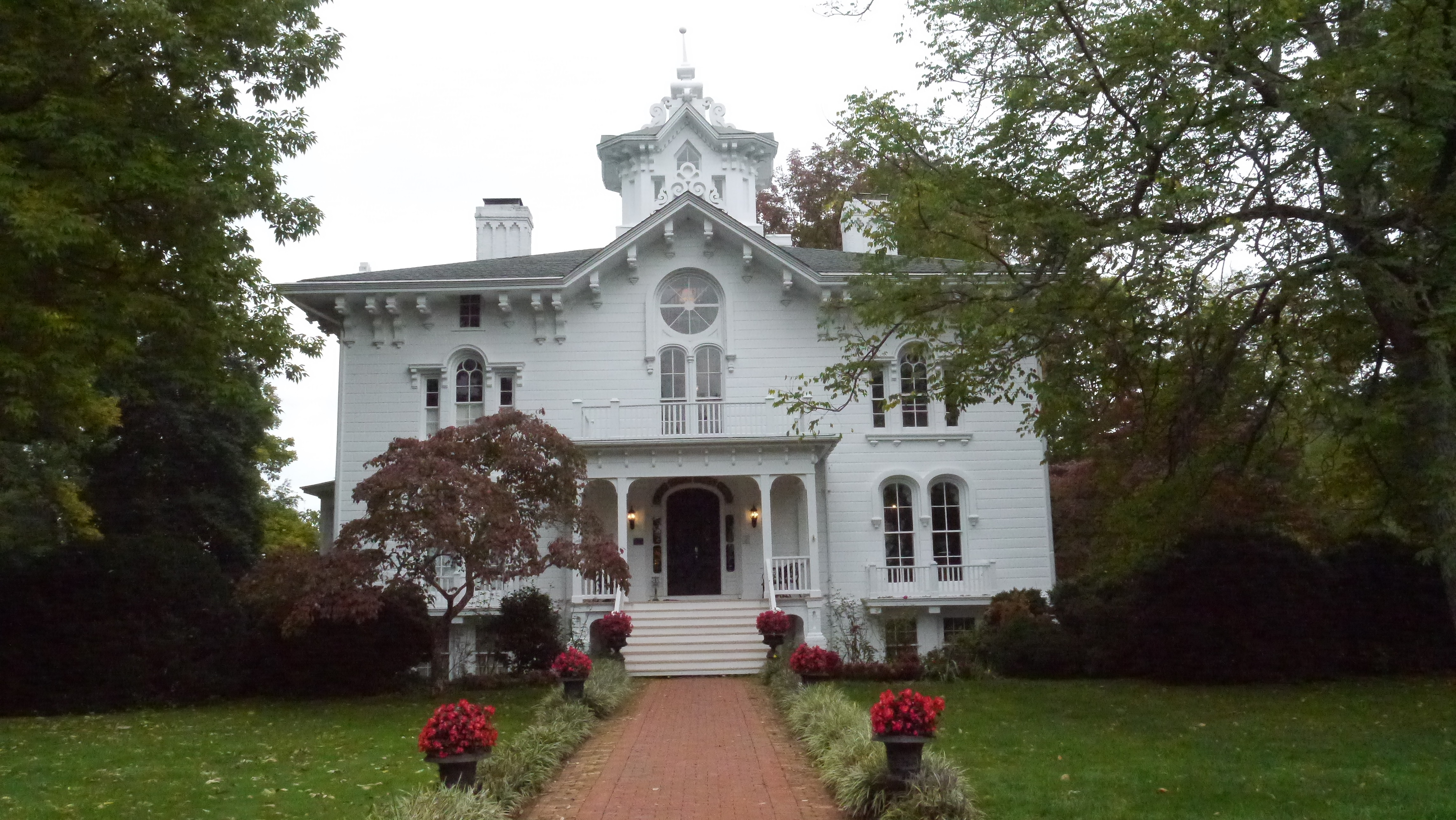
- Mayhurst Inn facade

- Location within Virginia Location within the United States
- Location: 12460 Mayhurst Lane; Orange, Virginia 22960
- Coordinates: 38°14′10.4″N 78°6′53.3″W
- Area: 0 acres (0 ha)
- Built: 1860
- Architectural style: Victorian
- NRHP reference No.: 69000268
- VLR No.: 068-0025

Significant dates
- Added to NRHP: November 12, 1969
- Designated VLR: September 9, 1969

Mayhurst is an 1859 Italianate mansion in Orange, Virginia. It was built by the Willis family relatives of President James Madison as the plantation house for an estate comprising 2,500 acres (10 km^{2}) of fields, pastures and forest. It was a scene of action in the Civil War. It is currently operated as an Inn.

== History ==
Mayhurst was completed in 1860 by Colonel John Willis, a great-nephew of President James Madison. Colonel Willis acquired Mayhurst, then and during his lifetime known as Howard Place, from the estate of Charles P. Howard in 1856.

During the winter of 1863-64 when the Army of Northern Virginia was camped in Orange County, Lieutenant General A. P. Hill had his headquarters in the yard at Mayhurst. The Mort Künstler painting "Tender is the Heart" is set at Mayhurst.

During Reconstruction from 1866 until 1870 the house was owned by New Yorker Latham Higgins. It was occupied by the family of Higgins' sister Laura Ann Higgins Bond and Federal Judge Hiram Bond their son Marshall Latham Bond was born there.

== Architecture ==
Mayhurst is a frame two-story structure set on an exposed brick basement with an attic level lighted by small windows in the eaves and circular windows placed in each of the four cross-gables of the hipped roof. The roof is surmounted by two large chimneys and a central belvedere. This belvedere reflects the roof shape which surrounds it and completes the total pyramidal massing with an elaborate finial. The entire exterior wall surface above the brick basement is covered by wooden drop siding cut to resemble ashlar stonework. The deep, overhanging eaves are emphasized by the placing of oversized paired brackets, with their undulating curves and pendants, around the entire roofline.

The three-bay main facade (north) features a central entrance porch with an elliptical-arched fanlight and sidelights framing the double doors. On the second level, twin-arched windows which open to the balustraded porch roof visually support the circular window above, set in the cross-gable. At either side of the central porch and window bay on the first level are also twin-arched windows with hood molds and shallow balconies. On the second level of the two end bays are three-sectioned windows in the Palladian motif. The east and west facades are similar, both being four bays wide and having arched windows. On the east front, however, a five-sectioned oriel bay was placed on the first story which is partially blocked by a frame wing added circa 1912. The rear (south) facade has been partially obscured by shallow wings and a sleeping porch.

On the interior, the broad central hall is divided at midpoint by an elliptical arch which rests at either side on piers alluding to the Doric order in detail. The stair which ascends along the east wall of the hall and curves at the beginning and end of each flight, develops a rhythm of design due to the repetition of the octagonal-shaped and turned balusters, two to a tread. In addition, the scrolled, uncarved brackets on the step ends and the fascia board on the landings increase the activity of the design, making the stairway the finest single piece of woodwork in the house.

Two rooms flank the hall on both sides and offer a calm contrast to the stair by featuring broad, flat window and door framings as well as black marble mantels with arched openings and subtle curving lines in the shelf. The southeast room has been partitioned into several smaller rooms, including a kitchen. Although most doors have a pair of small rectangular panels below the lock rail with two tall ones above, variations occur with the lower panels being octagonal while the upper panels have arched tops.

An old structure to the rear appears to date from the first quarter of the nineteenth century due to some remaining architrave door framings and doors, the brick noggin walls, and the 6'-10" wide fireplaces on both ends of the two-story, hipped roof building. This house is believed to be the original Howard dwelling.
