= Akron Art Museum =

Art museum in Akron, Ohio, U.S.

Coordinates: 41.084021°N 81.516318°W

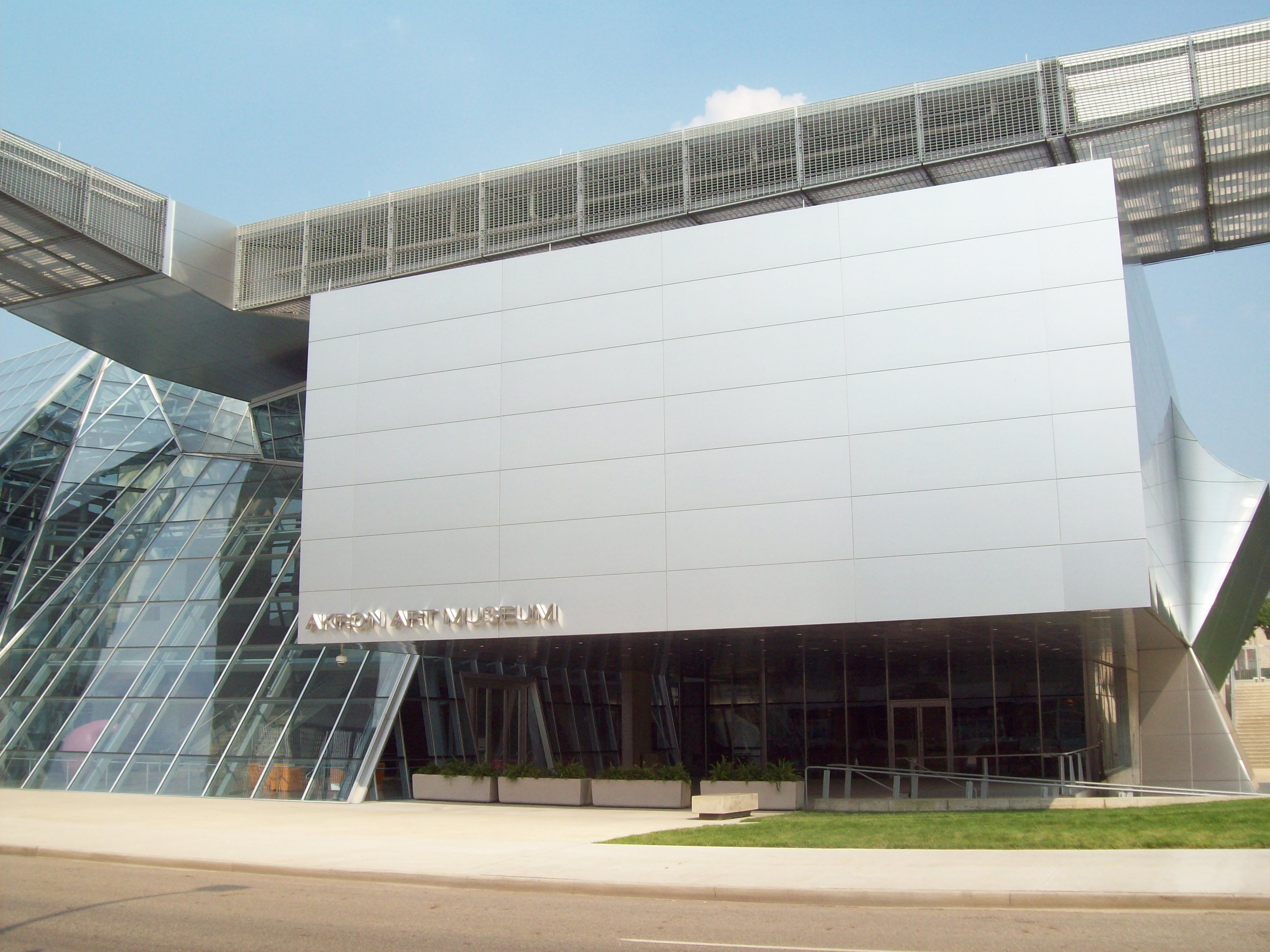
- Established: February 1, 1922; 104 years ago
- Location: One South High St., Akron, Ohio, U.S.
- Website: www.akronartmuseum.org

The Akron Art Museum is an art museum in Akron, Ohio, United States.The museum first opened on February 1, 1922, as the Akron Art Institute. It was located in two borrowed rooms in the basement of the public library. The Institute offered classes in arts appreciation which were organized by Edwin Coupland Shaw and his wife Jennifer Bond Shaw. Its first permanent home was the Akron Public Library, a Carnegie library building, from 1948 to 1981. It has grown considerably since 1922. The new museum was open to the public on July 17, 2007, and hosts visiting shows from national and international collections.

== Collections ==
The Akron Art Museum features 20,000 square feet (1,900 m^{2}) of gallery space dedicated to the display of its collection of art produced since 1850. The museum also hosts visiting shows from national and international collections.

1850–1950

Western art created between 1850 and 1950 graces the first floor of the museum's 1899 Italian Renaissance revival style building. The first two rooms feature examples of turn-of-the-century realism and American impressionism. Two rooms explore modernism and regionalism in northeast Ohio from 1910 through 1950. A final room is dedicated entirely to the work of William Sommer, a northeast Ohio artist. These galleries include paintings by Thomas Wilmer Dewing and Frederick Carl Frieseke.

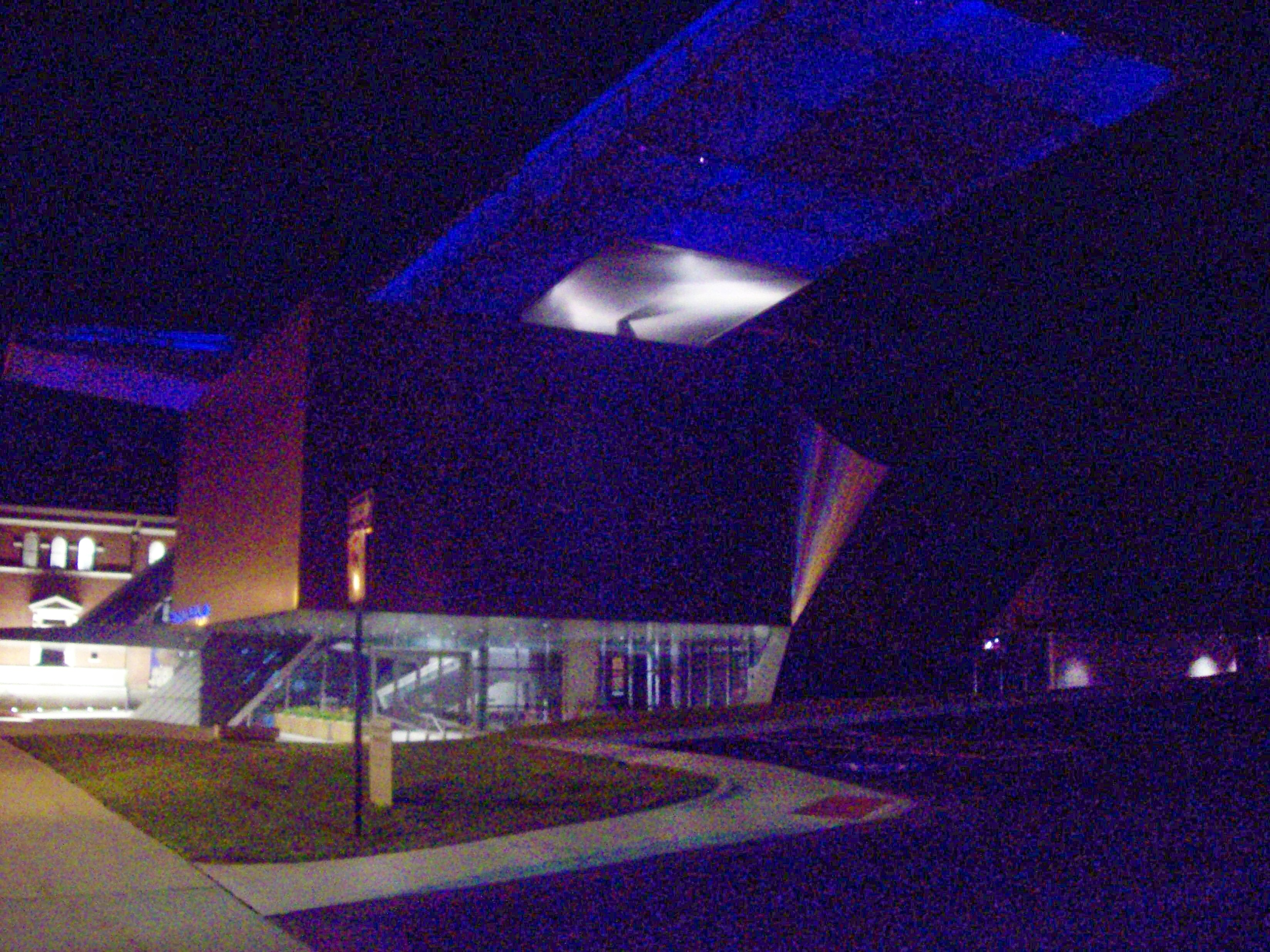
Akron Art Museum with lighted roof cloud

1950 to Now

Art since 1950 is featured in eight rooms located in the museum's 2007 Knight building. These galleries reflect the eclectic style of late twentieth-century art through examples of postmodern painting and sculpture, photorealism and Pop Art. On view are Chuck Close's Linda, an oversize early painting; Andy Warhol's silk-screened Single Elvis and Brillo Boxes; and Ohio carver and preacher Elijah Pierce's animated relief sculpture The Wise and Foolish Virgins and Four Other Scenes.

== Temporary exhibitions ==
Major temporary exhibitions are housed on the second floor of the Knight Building. These exhibitions include traveling shows, such as American Chronicles: The Art of Norman Rockwell, and shows organized by the museum, such as A Shared Vision: The Fred and Laura Ruth Bidwell Photography Collection. The museum also features more than 2,000 square feet (190 m^{2}) used for intimate exhibitions of emerging or mid-career artists, community-based art projects and changing exhibitions of photographic media.

== Knight Building ==
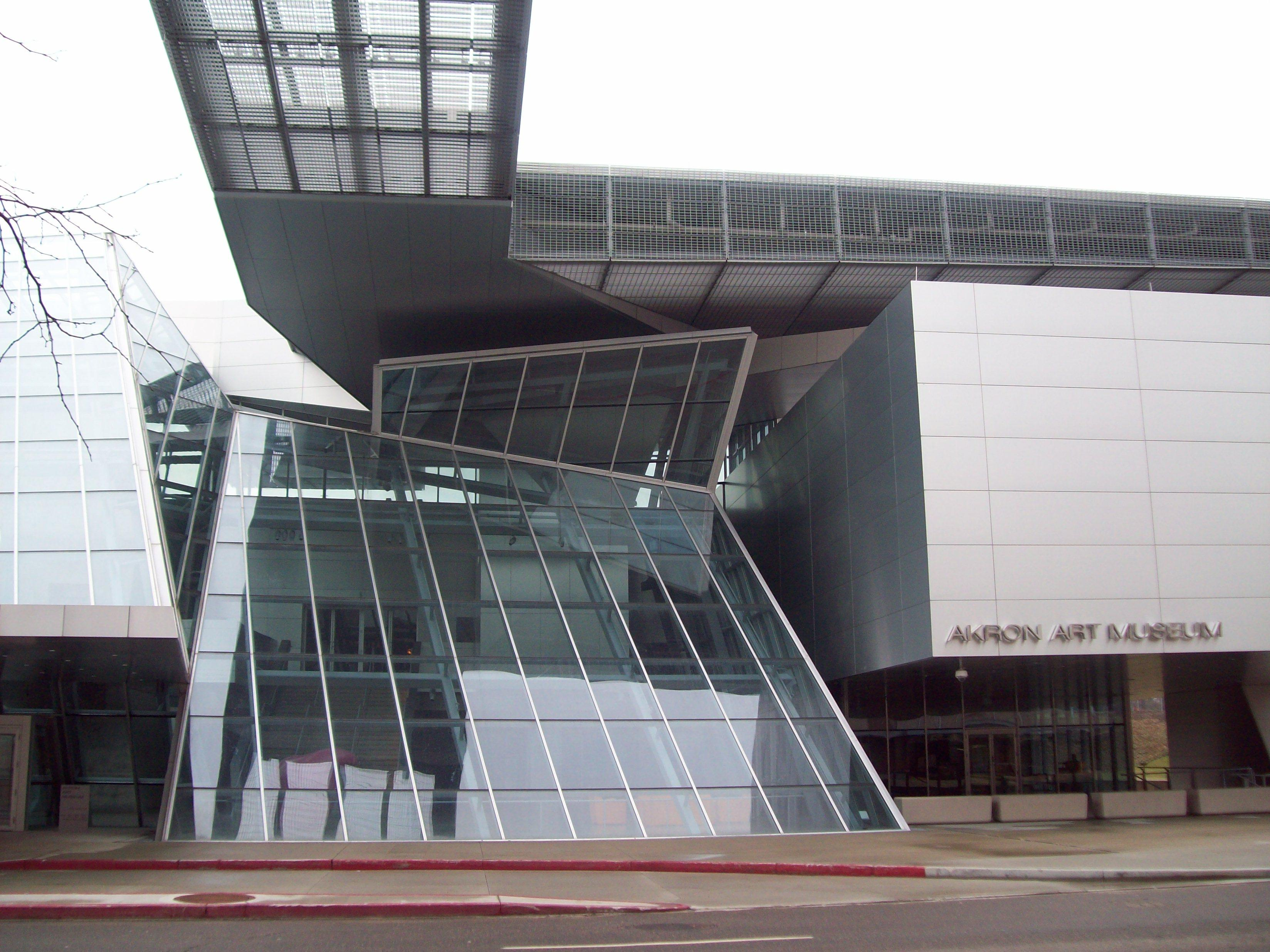
Frontal view of the Akron Art Museum

The 63,000-square-foot (5,900 m^{2}) John S. and James L. Knight Building was designed by the Viennese architectural firm Coop Himmelb(l)au following an international competition. The firm was chosen in part for its adaptive use of historic buildings, and the Knight Building is the firm's first public project in the Americas. Ground breaking for the new building was held on May 22, 2004.

Coop Himmelb(l)au's design integrates additional gallery space, an auditorium and café with the museum's 1899 building utilizing contrasting, surprising and fanciful visual elements:

The "Crystal", a three-story glass lobby that serves as the public entry and as the focal visual space connecting the museum's artistic, educational, administrative, and public programming; the "Gallery Box", comprising the Arnstein, Haslinger, Bidwell and Isroff Galleries, accommodates the museum's collection and temporary exhibitions; and the "Roof Cloud", a 327-foot (100 m)-long cantilevered steel and aluminum armature extends over the old and the new, creating a striking landmark for Akron's downtown which a critic once described as "a mechanical alligator snarfing down a Beaux Arts post office."

The expansion dramatically increased the museum's ability to present traveling exhibitions and to organize its own distinctive exhibitions. The expansion also allows for the display of major, rarely seen works, including Elliot Torrey's Surf, the first work to enter the Akron Art Institute's collection in 1923.

"The design embraces the past, rather than replacing or destroying it", said Coop Himmelb(l)au founder, and principal architect for the project, Wolf D. Prix. "It uses architecture to create a public space within the city and a private space within our own souls-reinventing both the city and ourselves at the same time. With such a project, there is a great opportunity to make a living contribution to a city."
