= Colonia Esperanza =

Coordinates: 28.4472°N 105.4544°W

Colonia Esperanza is a colonia located in the municipality of Julimes, in the northern Mexican state of Chihuahua.
