= Ben Viljoen =

South African general

Benjamin Johannes Viljoen
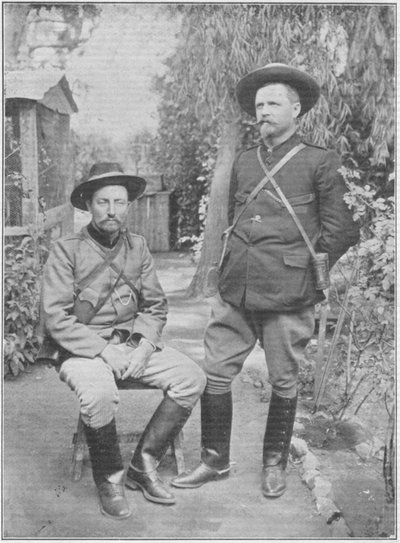
- General Ben Viljoen (seated) and his Secretary Mr. J. Visser
- Born: 7 September 1869; Varkiesdraai, Wodehouse district, Cape Colony
- Died: 14 January 1917 (aged 47); La Mesa, New Mexico, US
- Military career
- Allegiance: South African Republic United States Mexico
- Service years: 1896–1902
- Rank: Assistant Commandant-General Major
- Units: Krugersdorpse Vrywilligerskorps; Transvaal Burgher Force; Johannesburg Commando 1st Infantry Regiment, New Mexico National Guard
- Conflicts: First Boer War (1880–1881); Jameson Raid (1895–1896); Second Boer War (1899–1902): Battle of Elandslaagte (1899); Battle of Witpoort (1900); Mexican Revolution
- Other work: Member of the Volksraad (Transvaal Parliament); In 1902 published his autobiography My Reminiscences of the Anglo-Boer War; In 1904 participated in the Louisiana Purchase Exposition (St. Louis World's Fair); Civic life in New Mexico; Consul in Germany.

Benjamin Johannes "Ben" Viljoen (7 September 1869 – 14 January 1917) was an Afrikaner-American consul, soldier, farmer, Maderista, and Boer general.

== Early life ==
Viljoen was born in a cave in the Wodehouse district of the Cape Colony to Susanna Magdalena Storm (January 17, 1842 – Fabens, El Paso, Texas, United States, February 22, 1925) and Wynand Johannes Viljoen (Swellendam, South Africa, 1842 – Bakersfield, California, United States, 1914). This cave was the temporary residence of the Viljoen family while their farm house was being constructed. He spent his early years on the Varkiesdraai farm near Umtata. He attained the position of Assistant Commandant-General of the Transvaal Burgher Forces and was member for Krugersdorp in the Transvaal Volksraad. He was a South African Freemason.

== Krugersdorpse Vrywilligerskorps and the Volksraad ==
In 1890 he moved to Johannesburg and in 1896 he founded the Krugersdorpse Vrywilligerskorps experiencing combat with the Jameson Raiders. On the Uitlander issue, Viljoen was an ally of Paul Kruger. He is famously attributed to saying in the Volksraad that it was time to put trust in "God and the Mauser".

== First phase of the war ==
With the outbreak of the Second Anglo-Boer War he first did service in the Colony of Natal. He led the Johannesburg Commando, the great nemesis of the Uitlanders and he fought at the Battle of Elandslaagte on 21 October 1899, where he narrowly escaped capture by the British. Later Viljoen fought with distinction in the Battle of Vaal Krantz (5-7 February 1900) After the relief of Ladysmith on 28 February 1900 he took up a position on the Biggarsberg, attempting to stop the advance of Lord Dundonald in May 1900 onto Pretoria. When British General Ian Standish Monteith Hamilton crossed the Vaal River on 26 May 1900, Viljoen and his Johannesburg Commando confronted him with De la Rey and the Lichtenburg Commando. Viljoen was withdrawn to help with the defense of Johannesburg. After the fall of Johannesburg on 31 May 1900 he fought in the Battle of Diamond Hill (Afrikaans: Slag van Donkerhoek) on 11 and 12 June 1900 in central Transvaal. Viljoen was promoted to general and was ordered by General Louis Botha to defend the approaches of Middelburg at Bronkhorstspruit. After the lost Battle of Bergendal on 21–27 August 1900 Viljoen fought a guerilla war in Eastern and North-Eastern Transvaal.

== Guerrilla war ==
With the end of the conventional phase of the war, he formed a powerful guerrilla commando consisting of men from Johannesburg, Krugersdorp, Boksburg and the North and East Transvaal. His success resulted in him attaining the high rank of Assistant Commandant-General (November 1900). Viljoen's exploits included surprising a garrison at Helvetia in the Eastern Transvaal on 29 December 1900 and temporarily capturing 235 men and a 4.7-inch gun. In April 1901 Viljoen narrowly escaped capture by Lieutenant-General Sir Bindon-Blood and in August 1900 he protested to the same Blood about the use of blacks in the war.

== Capture, imprisonment and war memoirs ==
He was eventually captured at Lydenburg on 25 January 1902 and remained prisoner-of-war until May 1902 at the Broadbottom Camp, on St. Helena. It was there that he wrote his autobiography My Reminiscences of the Anglo-Boer War. The book is a realistic description of the war from a Boer perspective. Unlike other Boer generals he was not a property owner and thus hesitated to return to South Africa. He returned to South Africa as a pauper but refused to take British citizenship, thus greatly reducing his chances of resuming a public career. He was also disillusioned by rumours claiming that he had collaborated with the British, and he felt that his contribution to the struggle was not recognised.

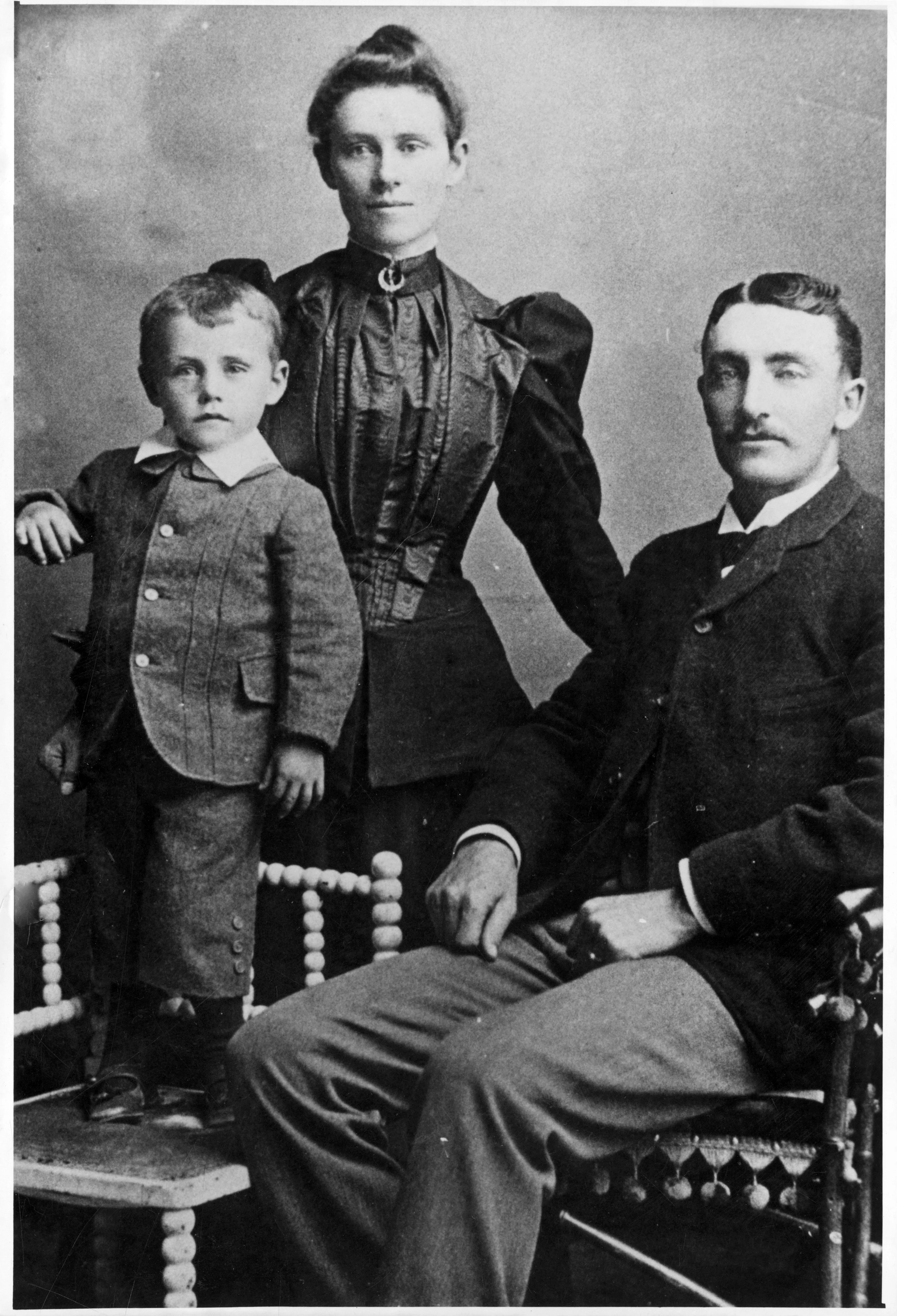
His eldest son Wynand, his first wife "Lenie" Helena Beatrix Els and Viljoen, before 1900.

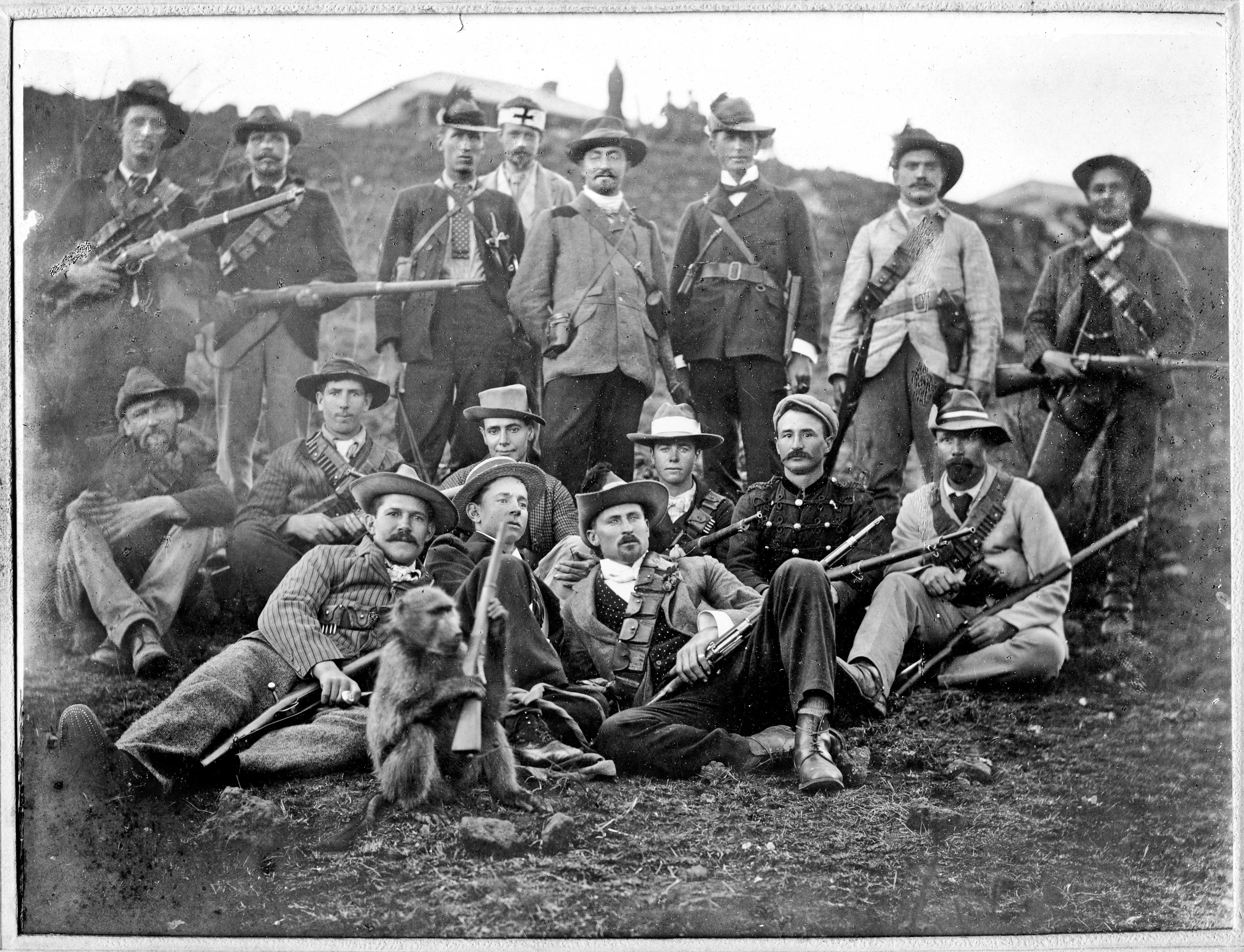
Viljoen and his Commando, Pelgrimsrus district (Pilgrim's Rest, South Africa). A baboon with a rifle, 1901.

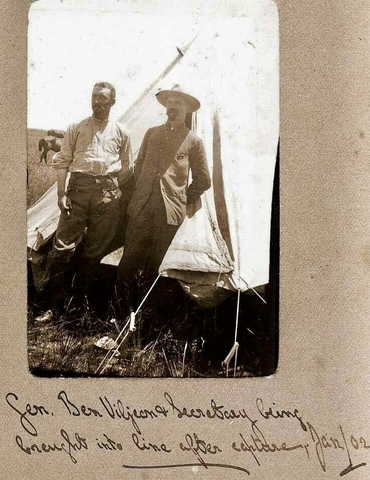
Viljoen and his secretary after their capture by the British, January 1902.

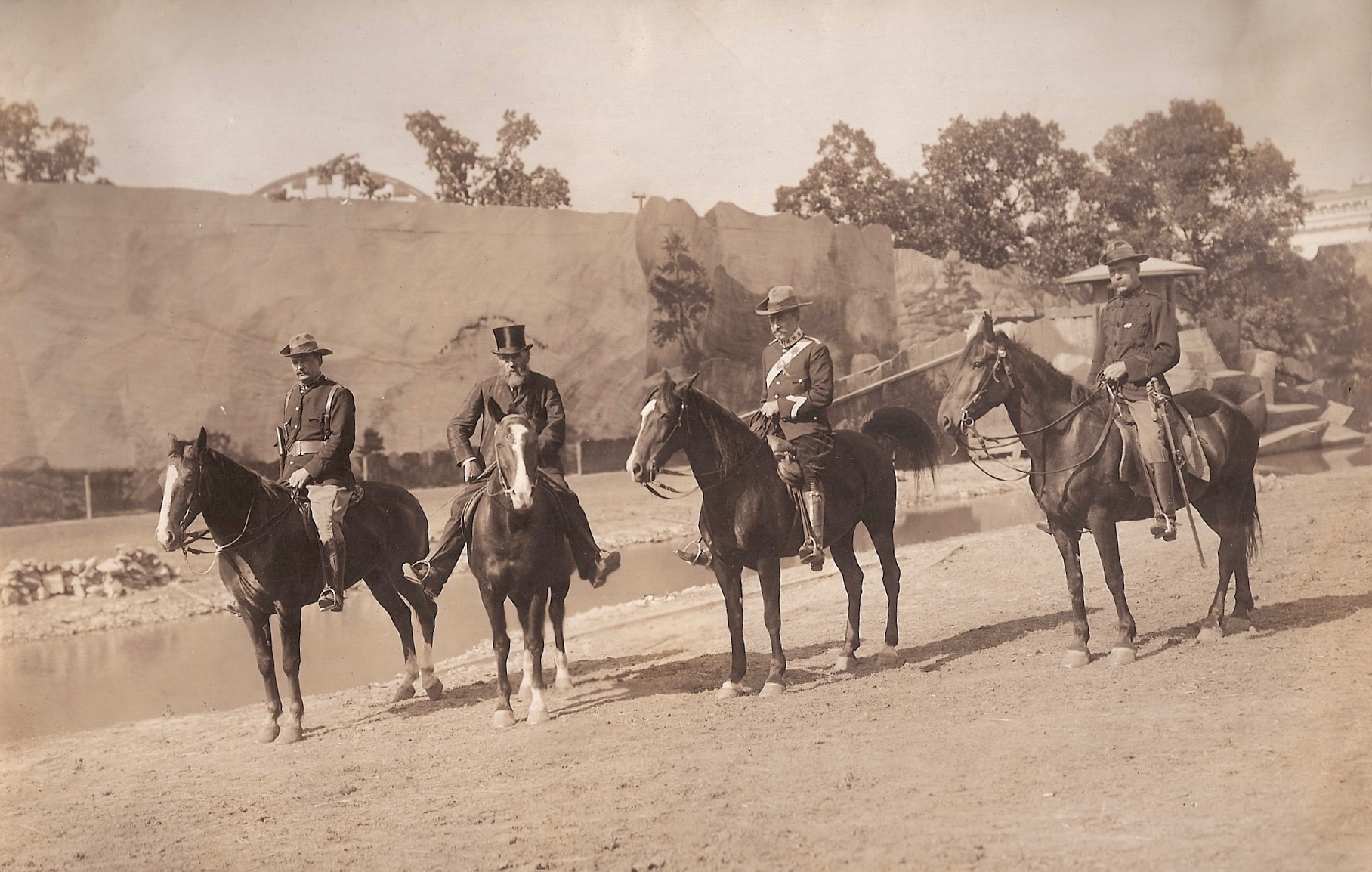
Commander Boshoff, Generals Cronjé and Viljoen at the Boer War spectacle, St. Louis World's Fair 1904.

== Boer Colony in Mexico ==
Ben Viljoen was one of the South African refugee officers who formed a farm colony in Mexico with the assistance of Theodore Roosevelt. Help with selecting and negotiating for the property were provided by two men hired by Roosevelt family friend Marshall Latham Bond and the husband of a Roosevelt relative Edward Reeve Merritt. It was located at Hacienda Humboldt in the municipality of Julimes, Chihuahua.

== United States and the Boer War Circus ==
He left for the United States in 1904 along with General Piet Cronjé (of Battle of Paardeberg fame) to take part in the Louisiana Purchase Exposition (St. Louis, Missouri) and the so-called "Boer War Circus" – portrayals of scenes from the Boer War. After leaving the fair, he settled down in the US. He divorced his wife, Lenie (née Els), who did not really want to leave South Africa, when the news reported he was engaged to May Belfort. He later married a US woman, Myrtle Dickerson. Attempts to establish a Boer settlement in the north of Mexico ended in failure.

== Civic life in New Mexico ==
He returned from Mexico to the US and was instrumental in organising Boer colonies in Doña Ana County at Berino, Chamberino and La Mesa in New Mexico Territory. He became involved in civic affairs throughout the Mesilla Valley, and in 1909 he was granted US citizenship. Viljoen became familiar with both President Theodore Roosevelt and New Mexico Governor George Curry. Viljoen was commissioned as a Major in the territorial National Guard's First Regiment of Infantry. In 1911, he travelled to Washington, D.C., with Curry and Albert Bacon Fall as part of a delegation promoting statehood for New Mexico. In April and May 1911, he fought with the Mexican Revolutionary Francisco Madero at the Battle of Ciudad Juarez.

Viljoen was also influential in agriculture. He introduced new crops and farming practices to the Mesilla Valley. Viljoen was interested in the creation of the Elephant Butte Dam and developed irrigation systems for the valley.

For a short while, he was US Consul in Germany, and also acted as military advisor to Francisco Madero until Madero's assassination in 1913. He died in 1917, at his farm in La Mesa and is buried at the Masonic Cemetery in La Mesa, New Mexico.

== Publications ==
=== by Viljoen ===
- Mijne herinneringen uit den Anglo-Boeren-Oorlog, W. Versluys, Amsterdam, 1902. In Dutch.
  - with P. van Breda (cartographer), My Reminiscences of the Anglo-Boer War, Hood, Douglas, & Howard, London, 1903. First author's name here "Benjamin Johannis Viljoen".
  - with A. Schowalter and H. A. Cremer (translators), Die Transvaaler im Krieg mit England, J.F. Lehmann's Verlag, München 1902, Series: Im Kampf um Südafrika. In German.
- Onder de Vierkleur, Zuid-Afrikaansche roman door Generaal Ben Viljoen, Em. Querido, Amsterdam, [1916]. In Dutch.
  - Under the Vierkleur. A Romance of a Lost Cause, Boston Small, Maynard & Company 1904.
    - Under the Vierkleur. A Romance of a Lost Cause, Special edition Louisiana Purchase Exhibition. South African Boer War Exhibition Company 1904.
- Danie : roman (translated title: Danie: novel), Amsterdam : Querido, [1916]. In Dutch.

=== by others ===
- Jan W. Meijer, Generaal Ben Viljoen, 1868-1917, Protea Boekhuis, Pretoria, 2000. Biography in Afrikaans.
- Carel van der Merwe, Kansvatter – Die rustelose lewe van Ben Viljoen (translated title: Chance taker - The restless life of Ben Viljoen), Protea Boekhuis, Pretoria, 2019. ISBN 9781485310563. Biography in Afrikaans.
