= Hiram Bond =

American judge (1838–1906)

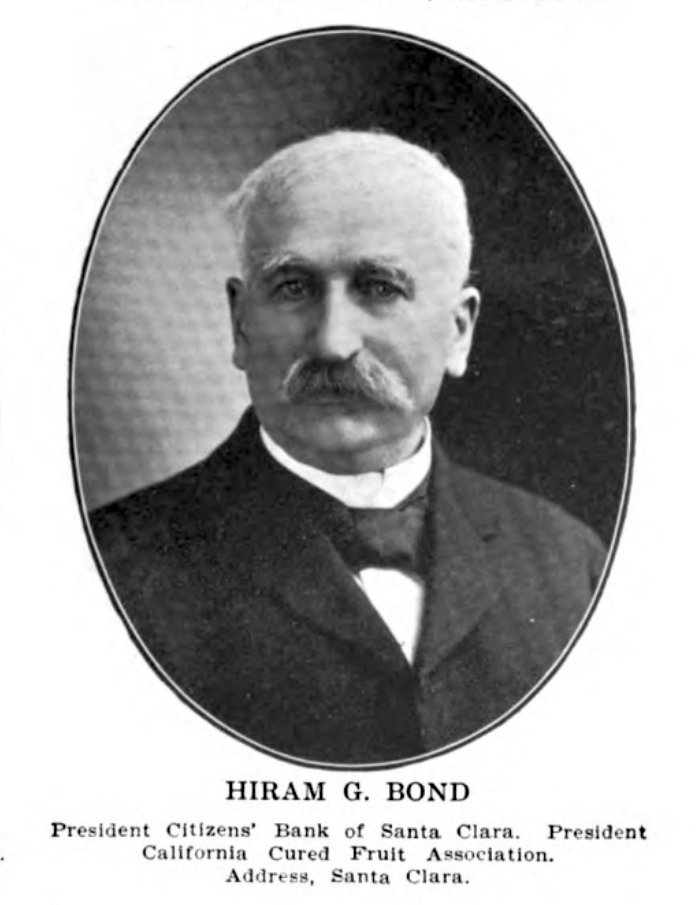
- Bond, c. 1903
- Born: Hiram Gilbert Bond; May 10, 1838; Farmersville, New York, U.S.
- Died: March 29, 1906 (aged 67); Seattle, Washington, U.S.
- Other name: H. G. Bond
- Education: Hamilton College; Harvard Law School (LLB)
- Occupations: Corporate lawyer; investment banker; investor; businessman
- Spouse: Laura Ann Higgins (m. 1864)
- Children: 2, including Marshall

Hiram Gilbert Bond (born May 10, 1838 – March 29, 1906), also known as H. G. Bond, was an American corporate lawyer, investment banker and an investor in various businesses including gold mining.

== Early life and family ==
Hiram G. Bond was born May 10, 1838, in Farmersville in Cattaraugus County, New York. He was the son of Almeda Slusser and Hiram Bond M.D.. His paternal family are descended from William Bond a politician in Massachusetts, and an early 17th-century immigrant from Bury St. Edmunds, East Anglia.

He attended Rushford Academy in Rushford, New York. Bond earned a bachelor's degree from Hamilton College.

He earned much of the money for his own education as a distributor of maps and atlases. Among his successes were becoming a publisher, and taking over the rights to a map of the United States which had been prepared by Matthew Fontaine Maury, a Southerner who was a United States cartography officer. Maury, who joined the Confederacy, left the work unpaid for in New York. He matriculated at Harvard Law School, but before graduation with an LLB degree in 1863. He was hired as a law clerk by Chauncey Depew, a friend and neighbor of his father in law Michael Dunning Higgins of Peekskill.

Bond was married to Laura Ann Higgins in 1864, and together they had two children, Louis Whitford Bond (born in New York City, New York in 1865) and Marshall Latham Bond (born in Orange, Virginia, in 1867).

== Early investment career ==
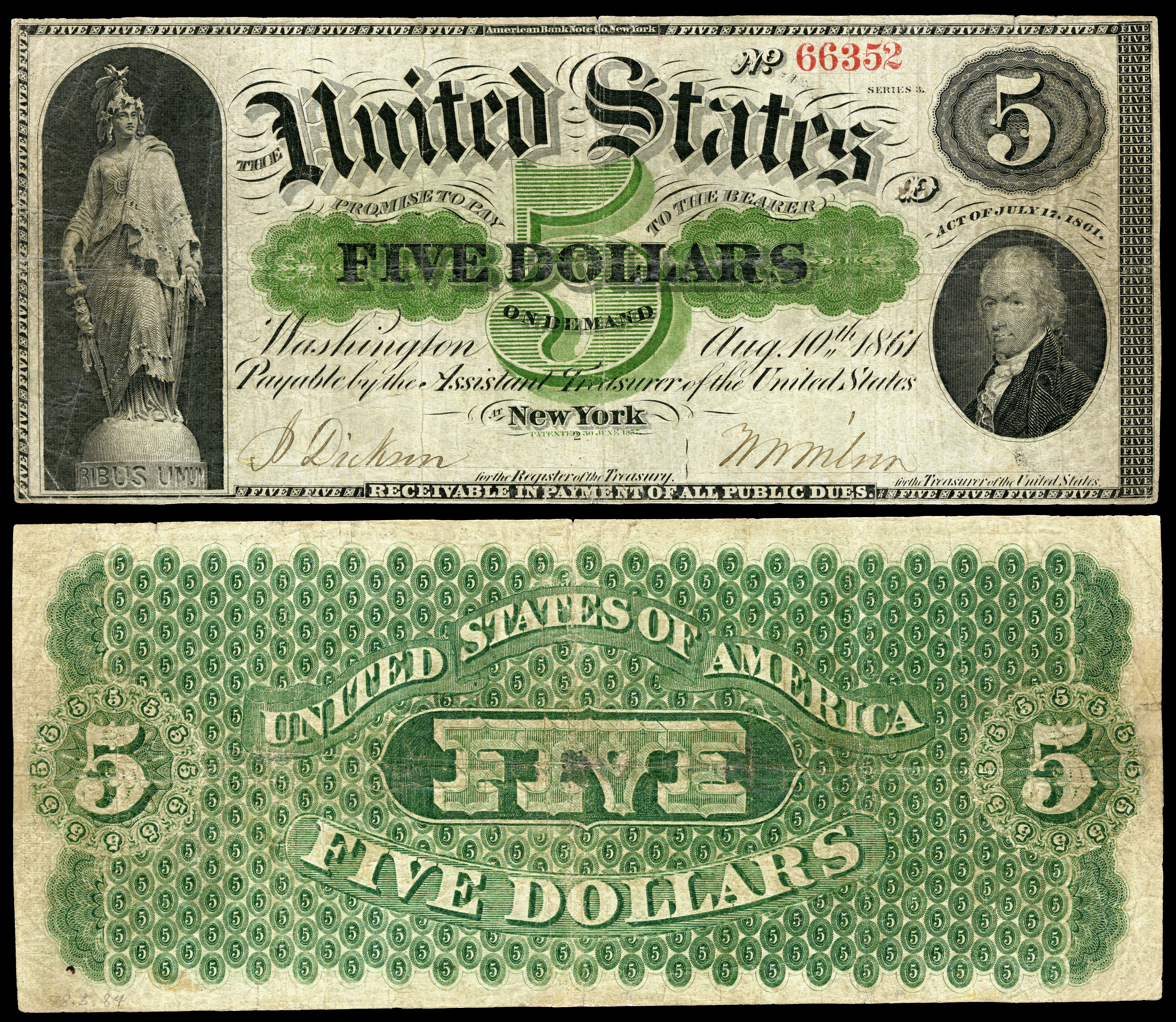
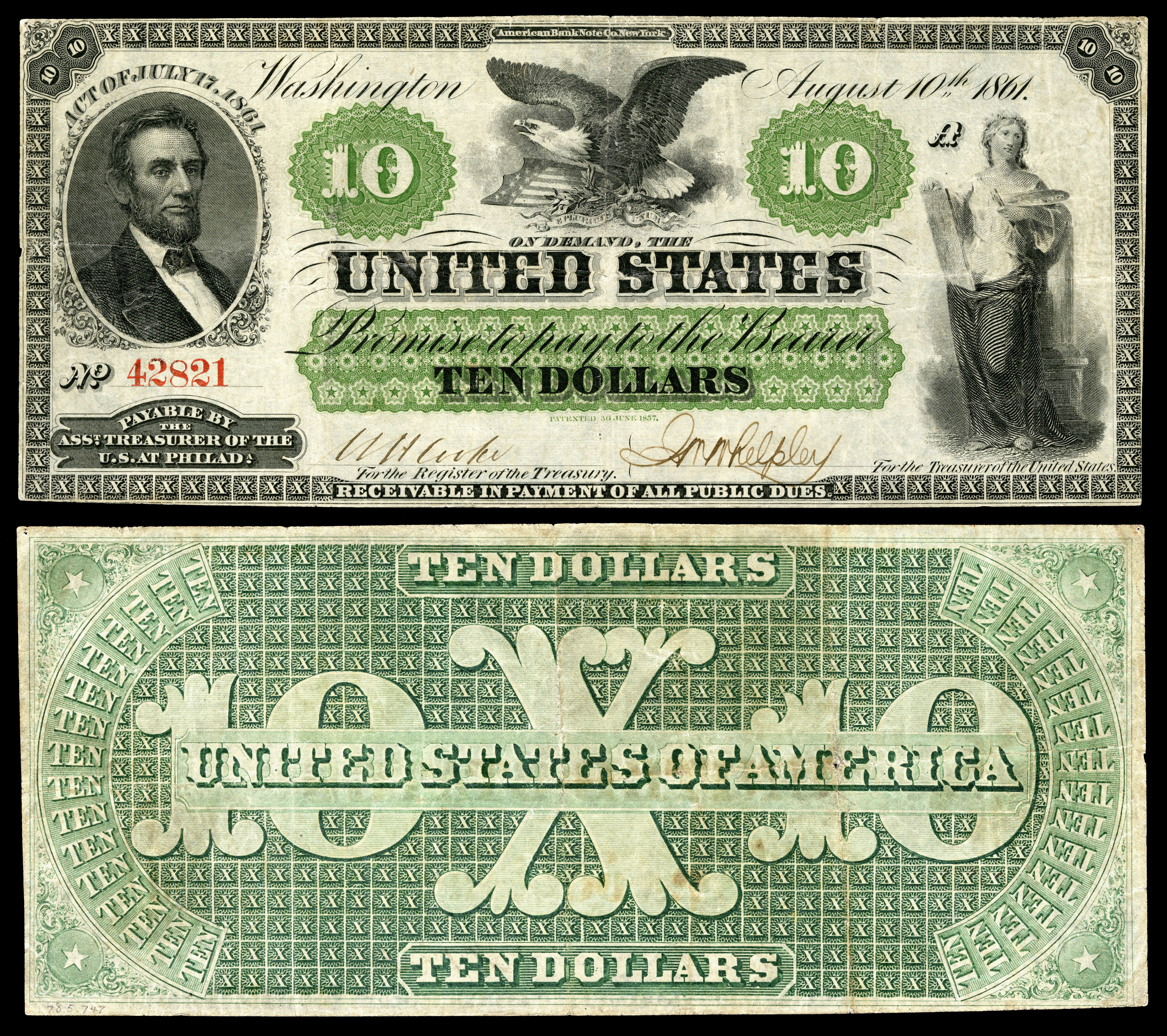
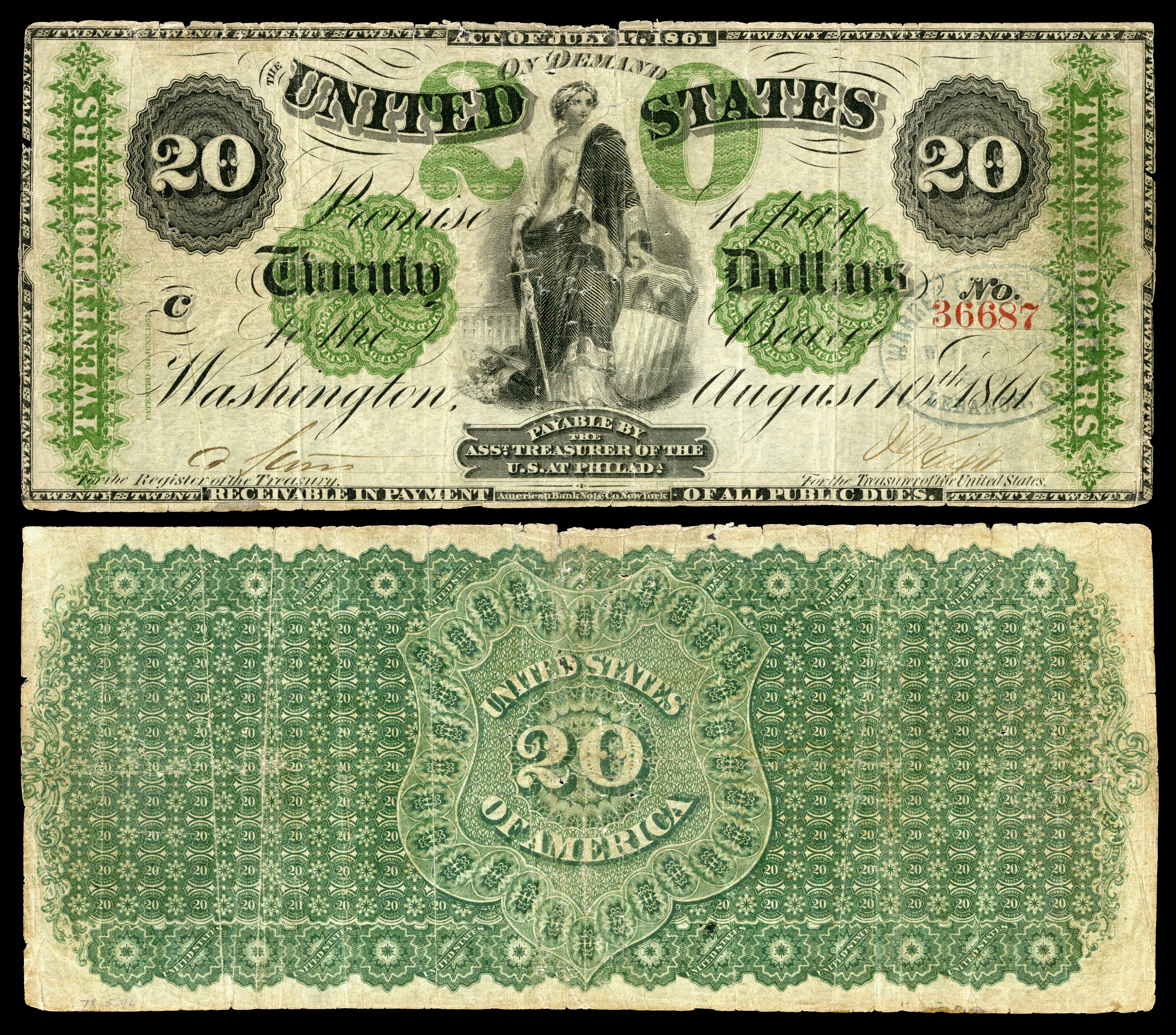
The United States Demand Note was authorized by Congress on 17 July 1861 and issued on 10 August 1861.

Through Depew, Bond was introduced to and became a broker for John Tobin & Co., part of the Vanderbilt Organization. At Tobin & Co. he was the floor broker for Commodore Cornelius Vanderbilt and his son William Henry Vanderbilt on the New York Gold Exchange executing their trading in "greenbacks" and gold during the Civil War. The value of greenbacks against gold varied widely as investors altered their perception on the progress of the war. Greenbacks United States Notes sold at a discounted price in comparison to gold. However, when chances of victory rose they were seen as a business opportunity. For the most part however, as the war was dragging on, people wanted the security of gold. Vanderbilt employed a private intelligence network on the front line reporting early news. Hiram Bond's position led to prominent contacts on Wall Street, in the military, and in politics. He is described by Professor Richard Lowe as having financial dealings during the Civil War with General Ulysses S. Grant. Among other investment houses, Hiram Bond was acquainted with Leonard Jerome, who was the grandfather of Winston Churchill.

== First National Petroleum ==
Towards the end of the Civil War, Hiram Bond acted as the Treasurer in a company First National Petroleum formed to roll up oil leases in the state of West Virginia. The bankers for the company were Duncan, Sherman & Company, a boutique which had represented the London banking house of George Peabody and Junius Morgan. John Pierpont Morgan had served his apprenticeship there prior to the death of Peabody but had left to form J. P. Morgan and Company.

== Judgeship ==
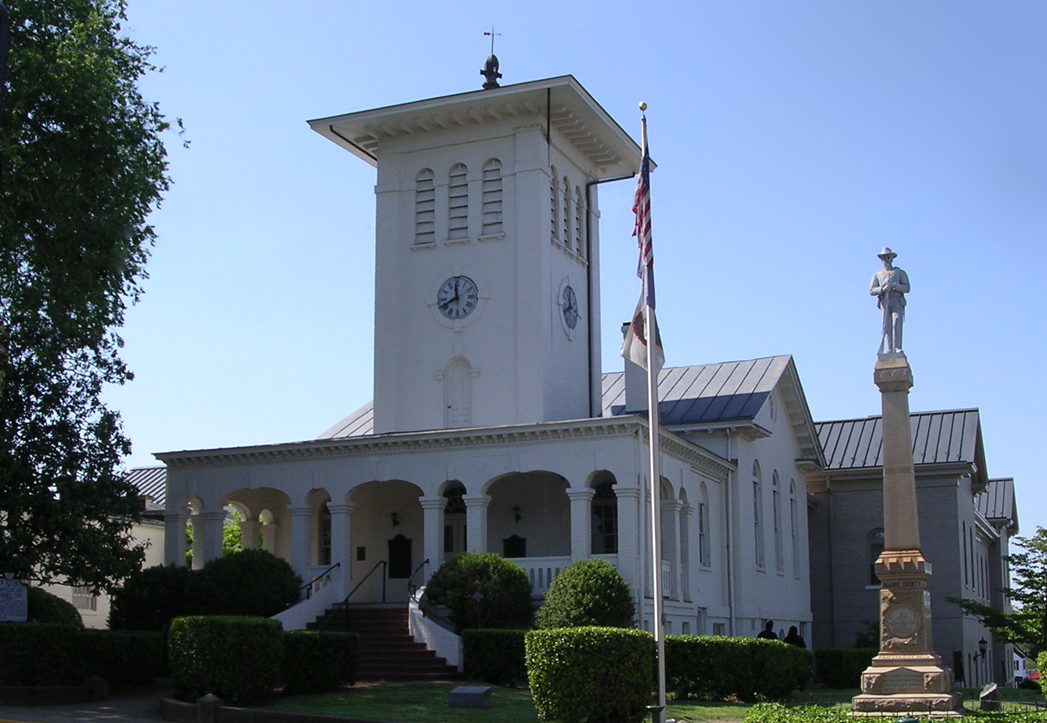
Orange County Courthouse and Confederate monument

Bond was appointed to a federal judgeship in Orange County, Virginia, in 1866 during the Reconstruction era. He was known as Judge Bond to many though his judicial offices ended in 1872. He was of importance in assisting a shift from an Accommodationist Francis Harrison Pierpont to a Radical Republican governor Henry H. Wells. He was resented by many former Confederate Whites for his support of Civil Rights for Blacks. In 1868 he was appointed to the position of Master of Bankruptcy for the state of Virginia by President Ulysses S. Grant. This position was based at the state capital, Richmond, Va. While living there he hosted a visit by Supreme Court Chief Justice Salmon P. Chase. His family remained at Mayhurst Plantation House in Orange.

== Business dealings ==
=== Denver ===
In 1870 Judge Bond began visiting Denver and the other parts of Colorado on business. On the evening of January 14, 1872, he was among local notables invited by the governor to attend a ball held for Grand Duke Alexei Alexandrovich of Russia. On the 15th the group hunted buffalo with Buffalo Bill. Later that year Hiram Bond purchased a small ranch on the outskirts of the town of Villa Park, Denver, Colorado where he acted as a cattle broker. The same year he organized the Denver Smelting and Refining Works with Joseph Miner and Denver Mayor Joseph E. Bates processing ore into lead and gold for ingots for the Denver Mint. The Villa Park property was sold to Helen Barnum Hurd Buchtel, daughter of P. T. Barnum in 1879. The Barnums then operated the Bond's Villa Park House as a hotel. The Denver homesite and yard are now called Paco Sanchez Park. While engaged in cattle brokerage with his brother in law he also practiced law. Judge Hiram Bond practiced law specializing in mining and ranching, he also dealt in real estate.

=== The Grape Sugar Trust ===
In 1881 Judge Hiram Bond became involved with the Des Moines, Iowa, corn starch and glucose producer the New York Grape Sugar Corporation. The other founding officers included Theodore Havemeyer of the Havemeyer Brothers led by Henry O. Havemeyer, the largest sugar refiners in the United States. Among the other principals were the New York State Republican Boss Thomas C. Platt, patent lawyer Edward N. Dickerson, a Philadelphia group composed of businessmen William West Frazier of Rittenhouse Square, Frazier's brother in law William Crawford Sheldon and his son in law Alfred Craven Harrison. Frazier, Sheldon and Harrison had a banking business in New York and an established business Franklin Sugar Company which imported and refined sugar in Pennsylvania. William Crawford Sheldon's daughter Gertrude later married Richard Whitney, President of the New York Stock Exchange. Judge Bond helped distribute the stock exchanging some with Charles D. Arms of Youngstown, Ohio for shares in Grand Central Mining. There was a resulting court case as to whether Judge Hiram Bond had exchanged those shares with Charles Arms as an individual or as a member of the partnership of Kimberly & Arms. This case eventually went all the way to the United States Supreme Court.

=== Kings County Elevated Railway ===
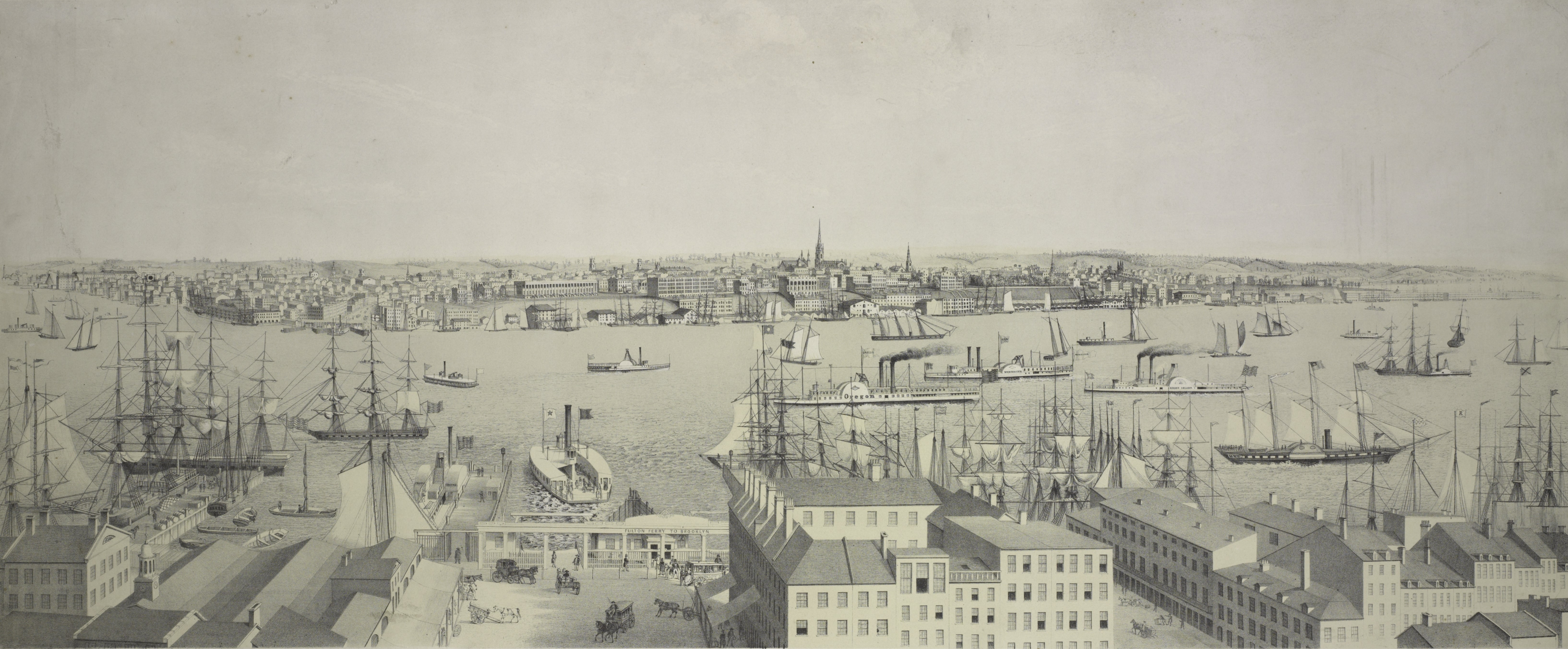
View of Fulton Ferry, L.I. From U.S. Hotel, New York 1845

Between 1879 and 1887 Judge Hiram Bond was also chief officer of a firm financed by investors from Boston led by Willard T. Sears and Moses Kimball. This firm had acquired rights to construct an urban transit system under the name Kings County Elevated Railway. This line was to run from the Fulton Ferry Terminal inland to the Queens border at City Line. Williard T. Sears was an architect who was able to add value designing the overpasses and bridges. Their package of rights and initial construction was eventually sold off to New York City investors led by Gen. James Jourdan due to the lack of support for the Bostonians by the local political leaders. Due to the persistence of Jourdan the project eventually got off the ground. The company directors besides Jourdan were Edward A. Abbott, Henry J. Davison, Harvey Farrington, Wendell Goodwin, Henry J. Robinson, James O. Sheldon and William A. Read. William A. Read was the financier whose company Read & Company later became Dillon, Read. Hiram's association with the KCER was so well known that it was commonly referred to as "Judge Bond's Road" according to The New York Times. During this period of time he was inducted into the Players Club at Gramercy Park founded by actor Edwin Booth for actors and lovers of the theater. He was also a member of the Union League Club of New York and Lawyers Club of New York. During this time he maintained an office at 115 Broadway in Manhattan and a townhouse in Brooklyn.

=== Alabama; Tennessee Coal, Iron and Railroad Co. ===
1899 Certificate for 100 Shares in TCI issued to FW Gilley Jr. & Co.

As a result of the ethical performance of his position being Master of Bankruptcy for Virginia he was respected there and in the South even by many former Confederates despite being a Radical Republican. This led to Judge Hiram Bonds involvement with the northern Alabama coal mining industry. He began by purchasing a house at Decatur and helping form a new company Decatur Land Improvement and Furnace Company there in 1887 as vice president and general manager. This company was formed with Major Eugene C. Gordon the brother of Governor John Brown Gordon of Georgia. He then became involved with Tennessee Coal, Iron and Railroad Company.

Judge Hiram Bond was the Chief Operating Officer of the Tennessee Coal, Iron and Railroad Company from 1889 to 1891. The TCI resulted from a combine of interests between a number of coal, coke and iron operations in Tennessee and Northern Alabama. Judge Bond was made an officer at the same time as John C. Brown a former General and Governor of Tennessee. The largest holders of the company stock were in two groups, one being led by a Southerner John H. Inman, the other group by New York State Republican Boss Thomas C. Platt. On Gov. Brown's death he was replaced as president by Platt. The Southerners won out in time though due to discomfort the Northerners felt over convict leasing and the poor initial performance of the stock. The Inman's removed Bond from his office, but by then he was already doing projects in other places.

=== Seattle, Monte Cristo Mine ===
Plan for the station at Monte Cristo dated 1892, likely one of Barlow's original drawings.

Hiram Bond became active in the mining and lumber industries and real estate in Washington in the early 1890s. Among his promotions were two companies based on mining near Monte Cristo Peak in the Cascades, Monte Cristo Mining & Milling Co. and the Everett and Monte Cristo Railway. This package of corporations, real estate and mining patents was sold off to John D. Rockefeller. Rockefeller had his representatives execute development of the mine, a railroad extension to the mine and a town. Among those who participated later in the period of opportunity at Monte Cristo was Frederick Trump (father of Fred Trump and grandfather of Donald Trump), who opened the first Trump Real Estate Office and Trump Hotel there. The lumber for the construction of that first Trump Hotel was purchased from Monte Cristo Mining & Milling while it was owned by Rockefeller. The mine there turned out to be marginal and Bond's sale showed good foresight.

=== Santa Clara Prune Industry ===
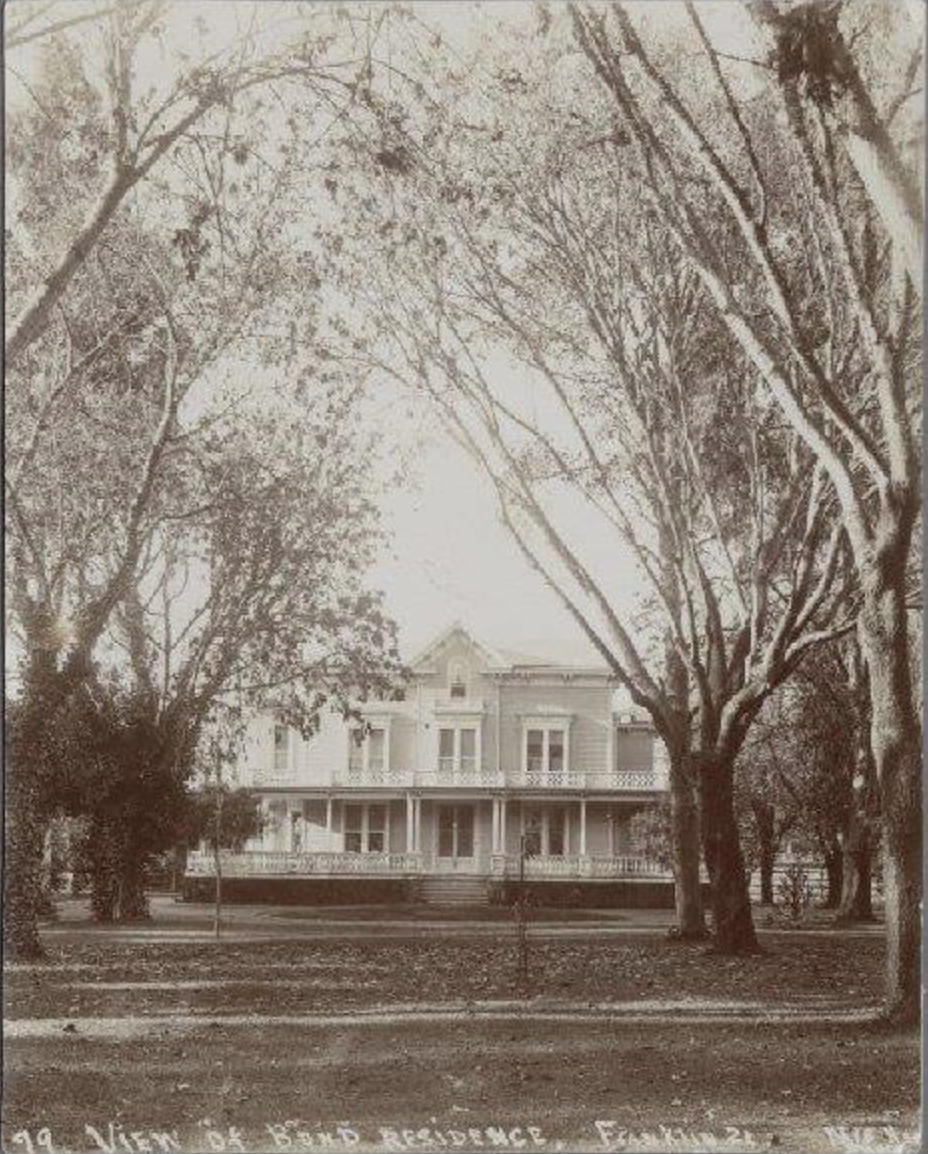
New Park Estate, residence of Hiram Bond (c. 1898) in Santa Clara, California

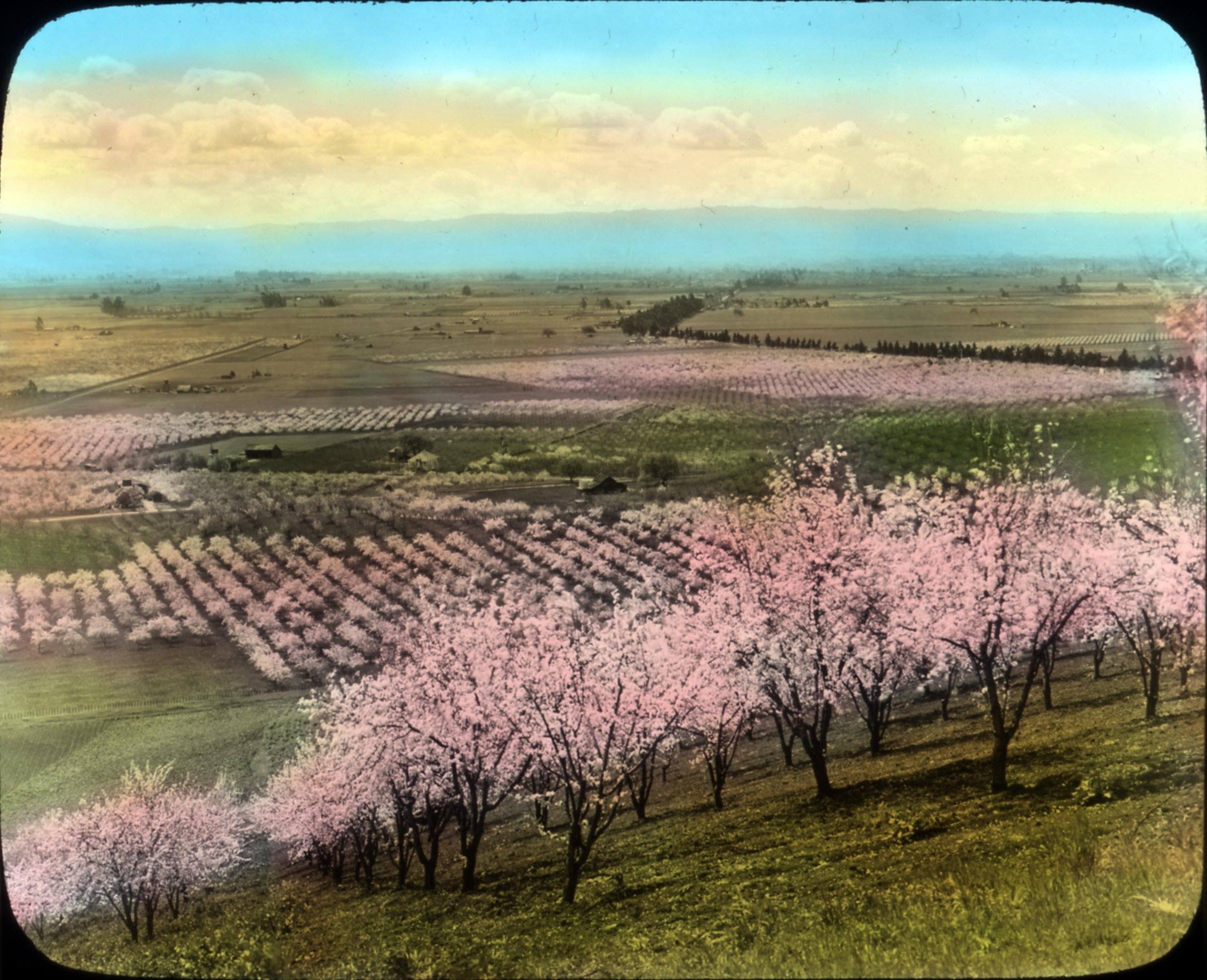
View of Prune Orchards near Santa Clara, California

Beginning in 1895 Judge Hiram Bond and a younger brother Elmer Monroe Bond a New York City wholesale produce dealer were involved in a fruit packing business in Santa Clara, California. There had been wide price swings in the price of prunes depending on the time since last harvest. Judge Bond constructed warehouses, set up a bank Citizens Bank of Santa Clara and he bought New Park Estate formerly the property of James Pieronnet Pierce. A fruit industry association he helped found and headed California Cured Fruit Association negotiated prices which increased due to storage and slow sale. The business succeeded until a bumper crop in 1903 proved too much to store. While in Santa Clara Hiram Bond was a cofounder of the Garden City Athletic Club (a gym). He was also a member of the Sainte Claire Club of San Jose, the Burlingame Country Club of Burlingame and the Pacific-Union Club in nearby San Francisco. At this time the Bonds also maintained a string of polo ponies among the Judge and his two sons playing at Coyote Point Park in San Mateo. At the time of the San Francisco earthquake of 1906 Santa Clara's water towers were knocked down and the community was supplied from the Bond's reservoir. He maintained an Irish coachman Nace, a carriage and a limousine which was used by his wife after his death whose California chauffeurs license number was 226.

=== New York again, American Mechanical Cashier ===
Among his last positions was president of the American Mechanical Cashier Corporation which had a plant in Jersey City, New Jersey an office at 40 Wall Street and a flagship store on Broadway. AMCC provided a suite for him and to be used as a reward for the companies salespeople and clients at the Waldorf Astoria Hotel in New York City. Among the others involved in the company were former secretary of the U.S. Treasury Charles S. Fairchild and investment banker Henry L. Horton father in law of Edward F. Hutton. The company was developing a proprietary cash register and had acquired the Isaac S. Dement machine stenography patents. Among those friends of the family who considered investing in AMCC was John Jacob Astor IV. The main near term business however was refurbishing some used registers made by the NCR Corporation that users obtained title to at the end of their leases. NCR wanted clients to upgrade with new machines under a new lease from NCR. Col. John H. Patterson financed Thomas Watson to set up a front company Watsons which would compete in that market with predatory practices. So AMCC was driven into bankruptcy and acquired by Watson's. The matter generated an anti-trust action after which Watson left to set up IBM. Among the injured investors in AMCC was Mark Twain.

== Jack London and the Bond family ==
Judge Bond is chiefly remembered as the basis for the character Judge Miller in Jack London's novel The Call of the Wild. Judge Bond's sons were Louis Bond and Marshall Bond who were mining engineers educated at Yale and Stanford. The Bonds owned the cabin and tent pitch overlooking Dawson City, in the Northwest Territory where Jack London had lived on a work exchange during the Fall of 1897 and part of the Spring of 1898. The Bond brothers had also owned the sled dogs that London used in Dawson working for the Bonds and other of his clients. One of their dogs was the basis for the character Buck.

London visited Marshall Bond at New Park Judge Bond's Ranch in 1901 at Santa Clara which included a plum orchard, vineyard and winery as well pasture for a string of polo ponies. The Call of the Wild begins with a description of the place.

Buck lived in a large house in the sunlit Santa Clara Valley, known as Judge Miller’s place. It stood back from the road, partially hidden among the trees, through which one could catch glimpses of the wide, cool veranda that wrapped around all four sides. The house was reached by gravel driveways that wound through expansive lawns and beneath the intertwined branches of tall poplar trees.

At the rear, the property was even more spacious than at the front. There were large stables where a dozen grooms and boys worked, rows of vine-covered servants’ cottages, a long and orderly collection of outbuildings, grape arbors stretching across the land, green pastures, orchards, and berry patches. There was also a pumping station for the artesian well, and a large cement tank where Judge Miller’s boys would take their morning swims and cool off during the hot afternoons.
