= Marshall Latham Bond =

American mining engineer, stockbroker (1867–1941)

- Born: March 10, 1867; Orange, Virginia, United States
- Died: September 6, 1941 (aged 74); Seattle, Washington, United States
- Education: Yale University; Stanford University, St. Paul's School
- Occupation(s): Mining engineer, stockbroker, cowboy, outdoor guide
- Spouse: Amy Louise Burnett (m. 1900–)
- Children: 2
- Parent: Hiram Bond

Marshall Latham Bond (March 10, 1867– September 6, 1941) was an American mining engineer, stockbroker, real estate broker, cowboy and outdoor guide. He was one of two brothers who were Jack London's landlords, and among his employers during the autumn of 1897 and the spring of 1898 during the Klondike Gold Rush. They were the owners of the dog that London fictionalized as Buck in his 1903 novel The Call of the Wild.

== Early life and education ==
Marshall Latham Bond was born on March 10, 1867, at Mayhurst plantation in Orange, Virginia. He was the son of Laura Ann Higgins and Judge Hiram Bond.

In 1872, his father purchased a quarter section 160-acre (0.65 km^{2}) ranch named Villa Park near Denver, Colorado. The land is now a neighborhood of Denver. Hiram Bond's brother-in-law was Latham Higgins, a Harvard-educated attorney, who owned a larger ranch further out of Denver. As he was growing up Marshall Bond and his older brother Louis were given increasing responsibilities on his father's and uncle's ranches. By the time they were at Yale University, during their summer vacations they were participating in buying trips and cattle drives as far away as New Mexico and Chihuahua, Mexico.

He was educated at Denver Public Elementary Schools, The Gunnery from which he was expelled, and St. Paul School in Concord, New Hampshire. Marshall Bond went to college at Yale University, where he was a member of Delta Psi. He graduated in 1888. He reentered college for post graduate studies in mining at Stanford University and obtained a master's degree in 1896.

Marshall Bond was married in 1900 to Amy Louise Burnett, the daughter of Jeanette Campbell McLean and Charles Hiram Burnett, Sr.. Charles H. Burnett was from Seattle, where he had been City Treasurer, a commission merchant, a real estate investor and an operator of coal mines. When his wife died young he had sent Amy Louise Burnett to live during high school with family friends Mr. and Mrs. Howard Cranston Potter of Tacoma who had children. One of Amy Louise Burnett's guardians daughters, Bertha Potter Paschall Boeing, was later the wife of aviation industrialist William Boeing. Bond and his wife had two sons, Richard Marshall Bond and Marshall Bond Jr. Richard was named for his godfather Richard Melancthon Hurd.

== Jack London and The Call of the Wild ==
Against the advice of his father, Marshall Bond decided he wanted to participate in the Klondike Gold Rush and managed to get his father to put up financing in a partnership, provided Louis went along to manage the purchases and expenditures. He left from Seattle in company with Josiah Collins, an attorney who also the town's former fire marshal. By the time they had reached Alaska, Marshall Bond became upset with the handling of his cargo by the ship crew and organized a shift of the destination from Dyea to Skagway.

In Skagway, while waiting for a teamster to carry his supplies, he and other miners became upset by the treatment of the miners by the resident packers, and he and other miner activists formed a committee which took control. The cross streets had no names, and part of what they did was name them after various prominent Alaskans. For the next ten years what is now Fourth Street was named Bond Street after Marshall Bond.

During the Klondike Gold Rush of 1897 to 1898, Marshall Bond and his brother Louis Whitford Bond owned a log cabin, storage building and tent ground on a hill overlooking Dawson City, Yukon. During the fall of 1897 and spring of 1898, author Jack London performed chores on a labor exchange for one of their tent spaces. The main character of the novel The Call of the Wild, Buck, was based on a large St. Bernard/Collie owned by the Bonds. The dog was lent to London by the Bonds for the performance of his work.

== Spanish American War ==
Marshall Bond went to Pampanga in the Philippines with a shipment of horses for the United States Cavalry. By that time there was not much action but a group of soldiers in the United States Occupation he was part of were sniped at and returned fire on Philippine Rebels.

== Business visits to Europe ==
The Bonds attempted to organize mining claims holders to establish a Yukon River dredging operation, and Marshall went to Europe to attempt to raise funds but found himself beaten by two other groups led by Joseph Whiteside Boyle and Arthur Newton Christian Treadgold. Marshall Bond spent several months in Europe during 1900 seeking mining investors, during which time he attended the Paris Exposition Universelle (1900) (the Paris World's Fair).

== American Mechanical Cashier Corporation ==
Marshall Bond worked in 1901 and 1902 as an executive for the American Mechanical Cashier Company, of which his father was president and a major shareholder. Among those people who Marshall Bond tried to bring in as an investor was a friend from his time at St. Paul School, John Jacob Astor IV. Despite the candy eating contest with school roommate Marion Ward Chanler, an Astor relation in 1883 which turned fatal (or perhaps because of it), the Chanlers and Astors remained friendly with the Bonds.

== Assistance to Boer refugee colony ==
In 1902 Vice President Theodore Roosevelt requested that Marshall Bond assist Roosevelt's cousin Leila's husband Edward Reeve Merritt, a Bond friend, to help a group of Boer refugees purchase ranchland and establish a colony in Mexico. Judge Hiram Bond's cattle dealing at Villa Park Ranch near Denver had included some previous experience with purchases from and sales to ranchers in Mexico. After Marshall Bond and Edward Reeve Merritt met and negotiated with José Yves Limantour and other federal officials in Mexico City and visited various potential sites, they bought a large ranch Hacienda Humboldt from Governor Luis Terrazas on the Rio Conchos in the municipality of Julimes near Delicias, Chihuahua. For more, see Creel-Terrazas Family. The Boers managed to farm there for about fifteen years, until they were displaced as farmers and managers by native Mexicans who were supported by populist labor agitators.

== Seattle ==
Marshall Bond's father, the mining investor Judge Hiram Bond, became active in the state of Washington in 1891 around the time he made a decision to leave his involvement in southern coal. The major mining activity that the family had in the state was the formation of a corporation to hold mining claims in the Monte Cristo Snohomish County area of the Cascade Range. Marshall Bond worked for his father and the investors as a foreman. The Bonds also invested in Seattle real estate. Marshall Bond's partner in real estate brokerage and development was architect Oliver H. P. LaFarge. Oliver LaFarge was the son of the artist John La Farge. The Bonds also invested in lumber in Skagit County.

While living in Seattle Marshall met and married Amy Louise Burnett, the daughter of Seattle pioneer Charles Hiram Burnett, Sr., who had been city treasurer, a commission merchant, then a coal mining executive, and had investments in real estate. The Bonds lived in a rented house on First Hill. Marshall Bond joined the Rainier Club and was an early member of the University Club of Seattle. In 1905 Charles Burnett assisted them in building a Charles Bebb-designed second home at Bean Bight Beach on Bainbridge Island. They were associate members of the Country Club of Seattle nearby on Bainbridge. Later they built a home 1230 Federal Avenue on Capitol Hill overlooking Volunteer Park. When the family circumstances declined they sold both homes and concentrated their household on Santa Barbara, California. After her husband died, Amy Louise Burnett returned to Seattle as her primary residence, where she died in 1954.

== British Columbia ==
Since the Bonds established a presence in Seattle in 1891 to invest in Washington, they had also been active in British Columbia. They were involved in the mining in the Ruby Creek district in the early 1890s. Among the local business leaders they were involved with were the James Dunsmuir Group and Count Gustav Konstantin von Alvensleben, known as Alvo. Marshall Bond also went camping, hunting and fishing in British Columbia many times. A book on the Tsimshian tribe of Hartley Bay recounts Bond's hiring an Indian chief for an excursion. A particular sojourn was made with British travelogue writer, explorer Warburton Pike along the Stikine River Valley in 1911.

Among the people that Bond and Pike met there at Dease Lake in 1911 and were then associated with was Osborne Beauclerk, 12th Duke of St Albans. Pike had met Beauclerk before in 1908 but had not seen him for a while. When Bond first met Beauclerk the Briton was recuperating from an axe wound in an Indian village where he had been treated with a gunpowder and oatmeal poultice by a shaman. They put on a modern dressing and antibiotics which Bond had brought along. This was done only to have Bond wound himself with the same axe, a Hudson Bay Co. shortly after. In order to have Bond and Pike take him along Beauclerk volunteered as camp cook and fire tender. Beauclerk was also later aide-de-camp to British Field Marshal Douglas Haig during World War I. Beauclerk's wife's sister married the Victor Cavendish, 9th Duke of Devonshire their nephew Harold Macmillan became Prime Minister of Britain. Beauclerk was a co-investor with Bond and Pike in various mining projects. When Pike died by suicide prompted by having been rejected for conscription a memorial to his memory at was paid for by Bond and Beauclerk.

== Santa Barbara ==
In 1912 Marshall Bond bought a house in Santa Barbara, California. Bond had been visiting a friend John J. Hollister, Sr., the son of William Welles Hollister whose family owned the Hollister Ranch and who Bond had met as a fellow mining engineering student at Stanford University. They had since spent time together during the Klondike Gold Rush. Marshall Bond worked as a consulting mining engineer, outdoor guide, real estate and stockbroker. He bought and sold properties in the Santa Ynez Valley and Montecito. He was briefly branch manager for E. F. Hutton Bond had a connection to Hutton through Hutton's father-in-law Henry Lawrence Horton, who was an associate of Judge Hiram Bond. Both were associated with American Mechanical Cashier. Bond was on the board of the Santa Barbara Club and Paseo de la Guerra. Bond continued living there for the next thirty years. His son Marshall Bond Jr. lived there until 1983.

== Mining consulting in Mexico ==
In 1917 a lieutenant of Pancho Villa kidnapped a group of American mining engineers working in Mexico from a train. When they tried to escape they were killed, and it became difficult to recruit mining engineers for work in Mexico. As a consequence the compensation offered to the mining engineers went up. Among those who took advantage of the opportunity was Marshall Bond, who took a consultancy with the Alvarado Mining & Milling Company, founded by Americans working with the heirs of Mexican mining magnate Pedro Alvarado, owner of a mine named La Palmilla near Parral, Chihuahua in 1918. Pedro Alvarado, Sr. had been friendly with Villa before his death, but Villa's men tried kidnapping Bond to hold him for ransom. The Villistas were unable to find Bond because instead of hiding in town he joined a group who fortified and supplied a nearby cave including a cannon.

== International counter intelligence agent ==
During the First World War Marshall Bond was turned down for military service. As a substitute form of national service he joined the Counter Intelligence section of the United States Secret Service. In this office he did port watching to reduce sabotage and politically inspired work stoppage. His duties also included arresting enemy nationals, which included among them the German count Alvo von Alvensleben, who was the godson of Kaiser Wilhelm, and the Austrian count Karl-Kuno "Rollo" von Coudenhove, who before the war were co-investors in various mines in the Cassiar district in British Columbia. Canada being a part of the British Commonwealth had declared war on Austria and Germany before the United States, and so they had come south. There was a suspicion that one or both were spies. After the war it developed that Alvensleben had supported the Canadians, Coudenhove had sided with Germany and Austria, but the actual spy rumored to be in the organization was probably the Cassiar company secretary clerk Joachim von Ribbentrop.

== Research on Billy the Kid ==
In 1926 Marshall Bond Sr. and Jr. accompanied a friend, Miguel Antonio Otero II, on a trip to New Mexico to interview the survivors of the Lincoln County War. Judge Hiram Bond had been among those who had been allies of John Tunstall and Alexander McSween. Judge Bond was a landowner who lost land in the Antonio Chavez Grant west of San Acacia, New Mexico near Socorro, New Mexico. The United States set up a Land Court which was run by men who wanted to void Spanish Land Grants to expand the federal public domain. Bond and his partners Arms and Higgins had sold the property to fellow Dernver resident Martin B. Hayes on a mortgage. This was litigated between Bond and Hayes who wanted to make sure the Grant was confirmed. This was in part due to the machinations of the Santa Fe Ring around Thomas B. Catron and Samuel Beach Axtell which saw land accumulated by a few large speculators. Miguel Otero was the former governor of the state of New Mexico, whose family had been merchants between St. Louis and Santa Fe, ranchers and cattle traders. They were business associates of Judge Hiram Bond during his time ranching at Villa Park Ranch in Denver. This resulted in a jointly authored book which was published under the name Miguel Otero and one of the most widely read books on Billy the Kid.

== Europe again and safari in Africa ==
In 1927 Marshall Bond took a trip through Europe and Africa writing articles for the Santa Barbara News-Press with a travelogue writer named Dr. Frederick Crockett who later with his wife Charis co led the Denison-Crockett South Pacific Expedition. Despite his having arrested Count Coudenhove during the First World War they had resumed communication and he was made the subject of a series of articles by Coudenhove in the Vienna press. Jack London's The Call of the Wild was a tremendous success when it was translated into German as Ruf der Wildnis, and Bond was introduced to other members of Austrian nobility and the Habsburgs.

The group traveled by boat and overland from Cairo to Cape Town. Between the Aswan Dam and Khartoum they traveled on the Nile by steamboat for two weeks with two Hungarians, Count Zsigmond Szechenyi a kinsman of Laszlo Szechenyi, husband of Gladys Vanderbilt Széchenyi, and explorer László Almásy. Almasy was later involved with the Hungarian government when allied with the German government of Adolf Hitler in the North African Campaign of World War II. The English Patient is a fictionalization of his career. There was a correspondence until 1934 of Almasy trying to get Marshall Bond to have Bond's friend William Boeing donate an airplane to North African exploration.

== Stockbroker in Santa Barbara ==
Due to the cost of having two sons in boarding school at St. Paul's and then college, and the fatigue his wife felt from staying in a succession of mining camps, he made a change. Marshall Bond took a job as a stockbroker and gave up mining for a while. He was with a firm named Mitchell Logan and Bryant, which went bankrupt in the aftermath of the Stock Market Crash. In April 1931 he hosted a visit and lecture by Hugh Bancroft President of Dow Jones and publisher of the Wall Street Journal. After the collapse of Mitchell, Logan and Bryant Bond then went to work for Edward F. Hutton. Bond had a connection to Hutton through Hutton's father-in-law Henry Lawrence Horton who was an associate of Judge Hiram Bond. For a brief period Marshall Bond was branch manager. By the time his sons were out Marshall Bond was ready for mining again.
