= Hacienda Humboldt =

Coordinates: 28°22′N 105°25′W

Hacienda Humboldt is an ejido in the municipality of Julimes Municipality, Chihuahua which was once a private cattle ranch. It belonged for a period of time to Luis Terrazas and was sold by him for the formation of a colony of South African refugees from the Anglo Boer War. Among them was the Boer general Ben Viljoen. The refugees were assisted in their project by President Theodore Roosevelt. He hired Reeve Merritt and Marshall Latham Bond to represent him before Terrazas and the government of Mexico. The colony never particularly thrived. The Humboldt colonists already beginning in 1908 to emigrate to more active Mexican towns like Ciudad de Chihuahua and farming areas like the Mesilla Valley, New Mexico near El Paso, Texas in the United States. Boers who stayed in Mexico married into local families, or moved away resulting in the loss of the community's identity with the Boers by the mid-1930s.

== See also ==
- Julimes Municipality

== Sources ==
- Mexfiles: The Boer Colony in Chihuahua

Taylor Hansen, Lawrence Douglas. "La colonizacío bóer en Chihuahua y el suroeste de Estados Unidos, 1903–1917. Historia Mexicana, LII: 2, 2002, pp. 449–489.
