= Julimes Municipality =

Municipality in the Mexican state of Chihuahua

Julimes
- Municipality
- Municipality of Julimes in Chihuahua

- Location in Mexico
- Coordinates: 28°25′N 105°02′W
- Country: Mexico
- State: Chihuahua
- Municipal seat: Julimes
- Founded: August 28, 1833

Area
  - Total: 2,767.3 km^{2} (1,068.5 sq mi)

Population (2010)
  - Total: 4,953
  - Density: 1.790/km^{2} (4.636/sq mi)

Julimes is one of the 67 municipalities of Chihuahua, in northern Mexico. The municipal seat lies at Julimes. The municipality covers an area of 2,767.3 km^{2}.

As of 2010, the municipality had a total population of 4,953, up from 4,507 as of 2005.

As of 2010, the town of Julimes had a population of 1,795. Other than the town of Julimes, the municipality had 123 localities, none of which had a population over 1,000.

== Geography ==
=== Towns and villages ===
The municipality has 48 localities. The largest are:

| Name | Population (2005) |
|---|---|
| Julimes | 1,756 |
| La Regina | 559 |
| Colonia San Jose | 507 |
| Colonia Esperanza | 404 |
| Hacienda Humboldt | 296 |
| Total Municipality | 4,507 |
