= BRD =

BRD may refer to:

== Places ==
- Brainerd Lakes Regional Airport (IATA Code BRD), Brainerd, Minnesota, US
- BRD Tower (disambiguation), name for two different office towers in Romania
- Germany (Bundesrepublik Deutschland; Federal Republic of Germany 1990 to present), the current country
  - West Germany (Bundesrepublik Deutschland; Federal Republic of Germany 1949–1990), the historical country
  - BRD (Germany), an unofficial German initialism for West Germany
- Bhandara Road railway station (station code: BRD), Maharashtra, India

== Organizations ==
- Alta Motors, a former American motorcycle manufacturer previously called BRD Motorcycles
- Baba Raghav Das Medical College, an Indian college
- Base Repair Depots, units in the Indian Air Force Maintenance Command
- Borland Racing Developments, an Australian racing car manufacturer
- BRD – Groupe Société Générale, a Romanian bank
- Rwanda Development Bank, Banque Rwandaise de Développement in French

== Roller derby leagues ==
- Ballarat Roller Derby, in Victoria, Australia
- Bath Roller Derby, in Somerset, England
- Belfast Roller Derby, in Northern Ireland
- Boston Roller Derby, in Massachusetts, United States
- Bristol Roller Derby, in South West England
- Brandywine Roller Derby, in Pennsylvania, United States

== Other uses ==
- Baram language, ISO code brd
- Biological Resources Discipline, a program of the United States Geological Survey
- Black Ribbon Day, a day of remembrance for victims of totalitarian regimes
- BRD Trilogy, three films directed by Rainer Werner Fassbinder
- Book Review Digest, a reference work
- Bovine respiratory disease, a disease affecting beef cattle
- Bulk reagent dispenser, a piece of laboratory equipment
- Business requirements document
- .BRD, a file type in the EAGLE design automation software

== See also ==
- BRD2, BRD3, BRD4 and BRDT, bromodomain families
- Business requirements document
- Bycatch reduction device, see Bycatch
