= Pacific Biodiversity Information Forum =

Pacific Biodiversity Information Forum or PBIF, is a regional, non-governmental, scholarly organization that seeks to provide a multilateral venue to support knowledge transfer and information access in the Pacific Islands.

== Establishment ==
PBIF was established in 2003 under the auspices of the Pacific Science Association. Preliminary discussions to create the forum began in 2001 at the third Global Biodiversity Information Facility meeting and an initial planning session convened in 2002. In 2004, a workshop took place to 1) further refine the PBIF concept as a vehicle for collaboration and innovation; 2) explore ways to make biodiversity data more fully available to the Pacific Basin and rim nations; and 3) to identify potential pilot projects that would further biodiversity efforts in the Pacific. The workshop attendees, Asia/Oceania-based governmental, intergovernmental, and non-governmental organizations, embraced PBIF as a vehicle to provide access to credible scientific information that is both easy to find and targeted to specific needs of the people in the region.

== Activities ==
Whereas many current regional informatics initiatives focus much of their attention on information management of non-living resources, PBIF invests wholly in the information management of Pacific island organisms. PBIF is designed to aggregate, organize, and disseminate available biodiversity data in an electronically accessible information system. The PBIF effort is not intended to replace any existing activity, but to complement, link and strengthen current regional activities.

== Mission statement ==
The Pacific Biodiversity Information Forum seeks to develop a complete, scientifically sound, and electronically accessible Pacific biological knowledge base and make it widely available to local, national, regional and global users for decision-making.

== Scope ==
Geographic- Polynesia, Melanesia, Micronesia and Southeast Asia

Thematic- Taxonomy, Invasive Species, Threatened and Endangered Species

User Base- Resource managers, scientists, policy makers in the public, private, and civic sectors, and the general public

== Administration ==
Dr. Mark Fornwall serves as the Gateway Node Manager; Rhyn Davies coordinated Content and Technical Development.

== New locations of data and services ==
Since mid-2011, some data and services formerly provided by PBIF are now available at other online locations:

- E-mail lists formerly hosted by PBIF are now hosted by the Hawaiian Ecosystems at Risk (HEAR) project.
