= Split View Mountain Lodge =

Building in Geilo, Norway

Coordinates: 60.5495°N 8.2003°E

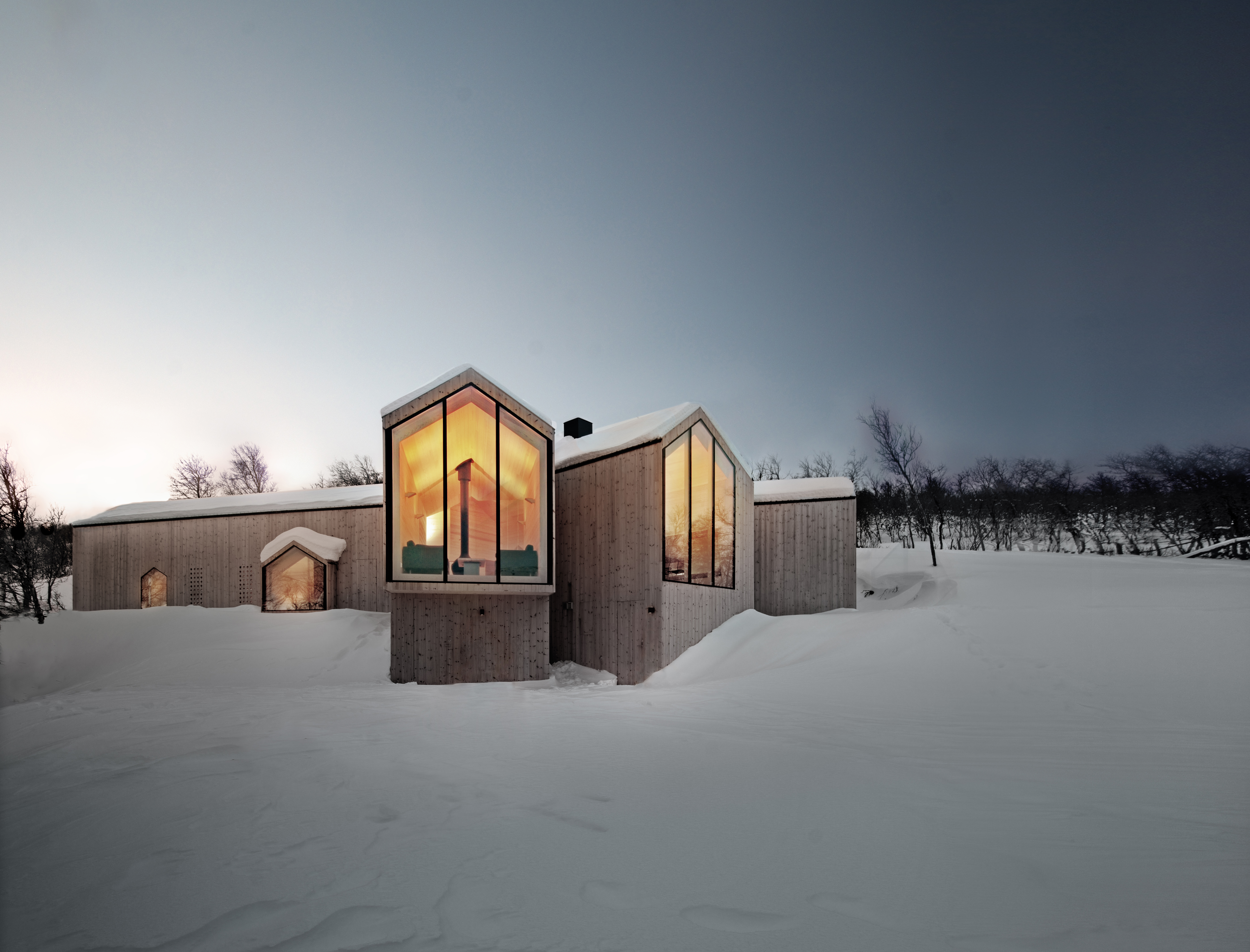
- Interactive map of the Split View Mountain Lodge area

General information
- Architectural style: Norwegian
- Location: Geilo, Norway
- Construction started: 2011
- Completed: 2013

Technical details
- Floor area: 130 square metres (1,400 sq ft)

Design and construction
- Architect: Reiulf Ramstad Arkitekter
- Awards and prizes: 2016 German Design Award

Website
- www.reiulframstadarkitekter.com/work/split-view-mountain-lodge

Split View Mountain Lodge (also occasionally called Havsdalen Holiday Home or Holiday Home Havsdalen) is an architecture project by the firm Reiulf Ramstad Arkitekter near the ski resort Havsdalen in Geilo, Norway. It won the 2016 German Design Award for Excellent Communications Design in Architecture. The house has also been the subject of coverage in architecture magazines including EK and Plain. It was commissioned in 2011 by a private client to be a holiday home, to be built with 4 bedrooms.

The building has been praised for integrating into its landscape and being a good example of contemporary Norwegian architecture. The home's façade splits into 2 living areas after the main wing. There is also a detached annex to accommodate guests.

The siding is largely made from timber, which is a common feature of Norwegian architecture. The timber cladding was chosen because it will change color and become grey over time; an aesthetic choice.
