= BRD Tower =

BRD Tower may refer to:

- BRD Tower Bucharest
- BRD Tower Cluj-Napoca
