= Knarvik Church =

Church in Vestland, Norway

- Knarvik kyrkje
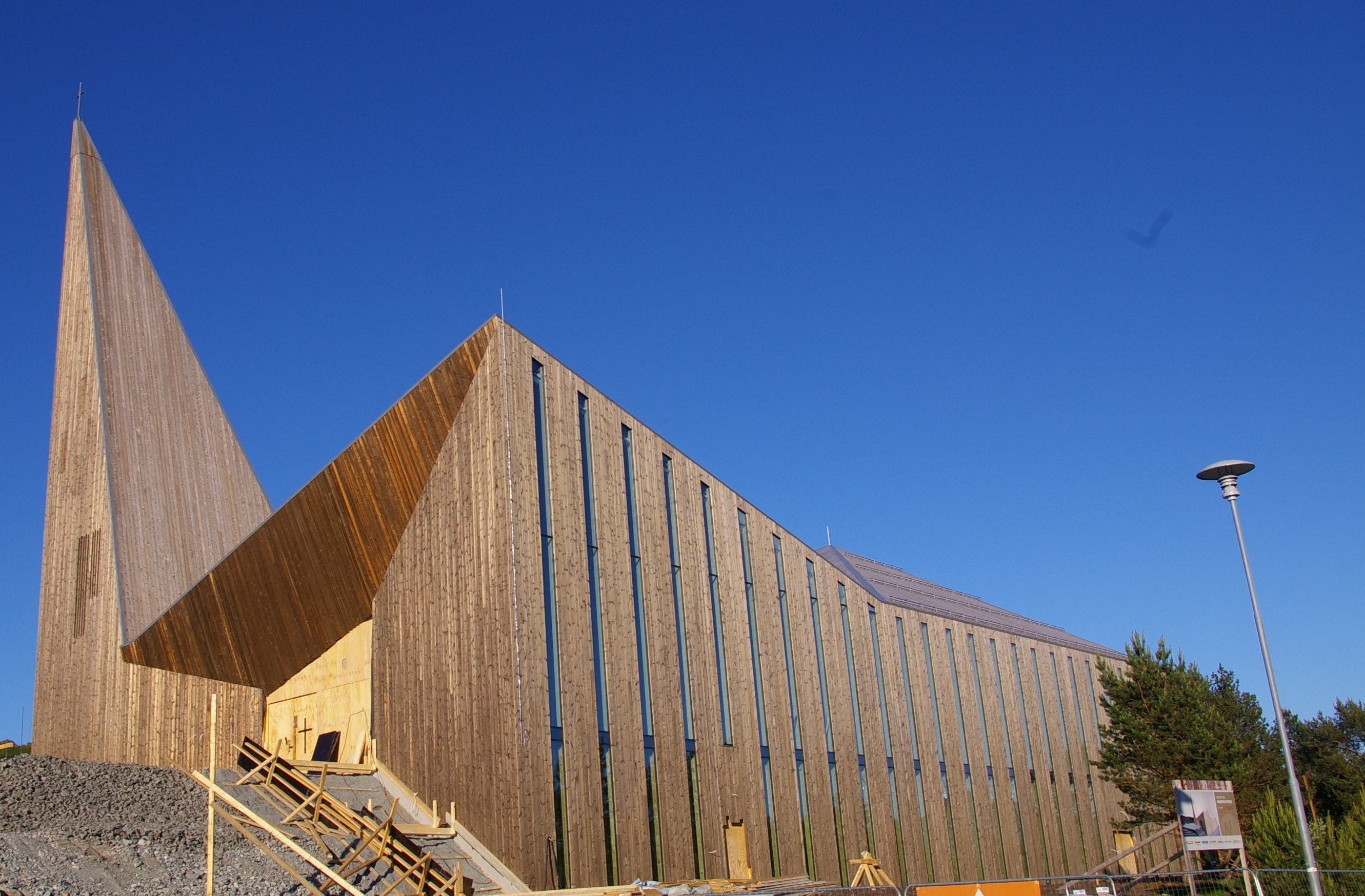
- View of the church
- Knarvik Church
- 60°32′58″N 5°17′18″E
- Location: Alver Municipality, Vestland
- Country: Norway
- Denomination: Church of Norway
- Churchmanship: Evangelical Lutheran
- Website: knarvikkyrkje.no

History
- Status: Parish church
- Founded: 2014
- Consecrated: 30 November 2014

Architecture
- Functional status: Active
- Architect: Reiulf Ramstad Arkitekter
- Architectural type: Long church
- Style: Modern
- Groundbreaking: 15 September 2013
- Completed: 2014 (12 years ago)

Specifications
- Capacity: 500
- Materials: Wood

Administration
- Diocese: Bjørgvin bispedømme
- Deanery: Nordhordland prosti
- Parish: Knarvik

Knarvik Church (Norwegian: Knarvik kyrkje) is a parish church of the Church of Norway in Alver Municipality in Vestland county, Norway. It is located in the village of Knarvik. It is one of the four churches for the Knarvik parish which is part of the Nordhordland prosti (deanery) in the Diocese of Bjørgvin. The wooden church was built in a modern long church design in 2014 using plans drawn up by the architectural firm Reiulf Ramstad Arkitekter. The church seats about 500 people.

== History ==
Work on the church site began on 3 November 2012, and on 15 September 2013 the Bishop Halvor Nordhaug laid the foundation stone during a church service on the construction site. The church council budgeted 70 million kr for the church. The church was designed by the firm of Reiulf Ramstad Arkitekter. The modern-style church was consecrated on 30 November 2014. The exterior of the building features the markedly rising roofs of the spire, church sanctuary, and chapel.

== Media gallery ==
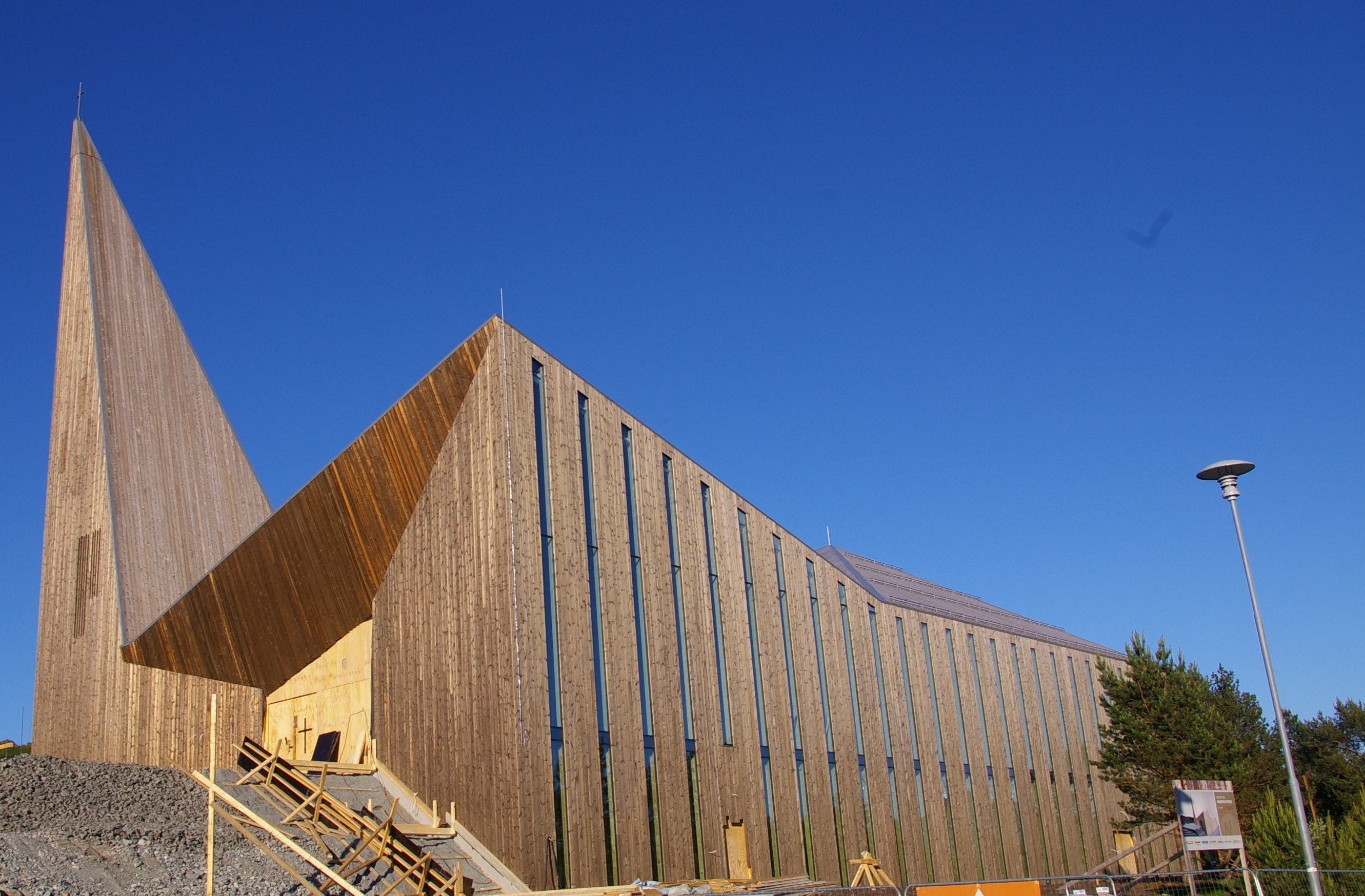
Exterior view

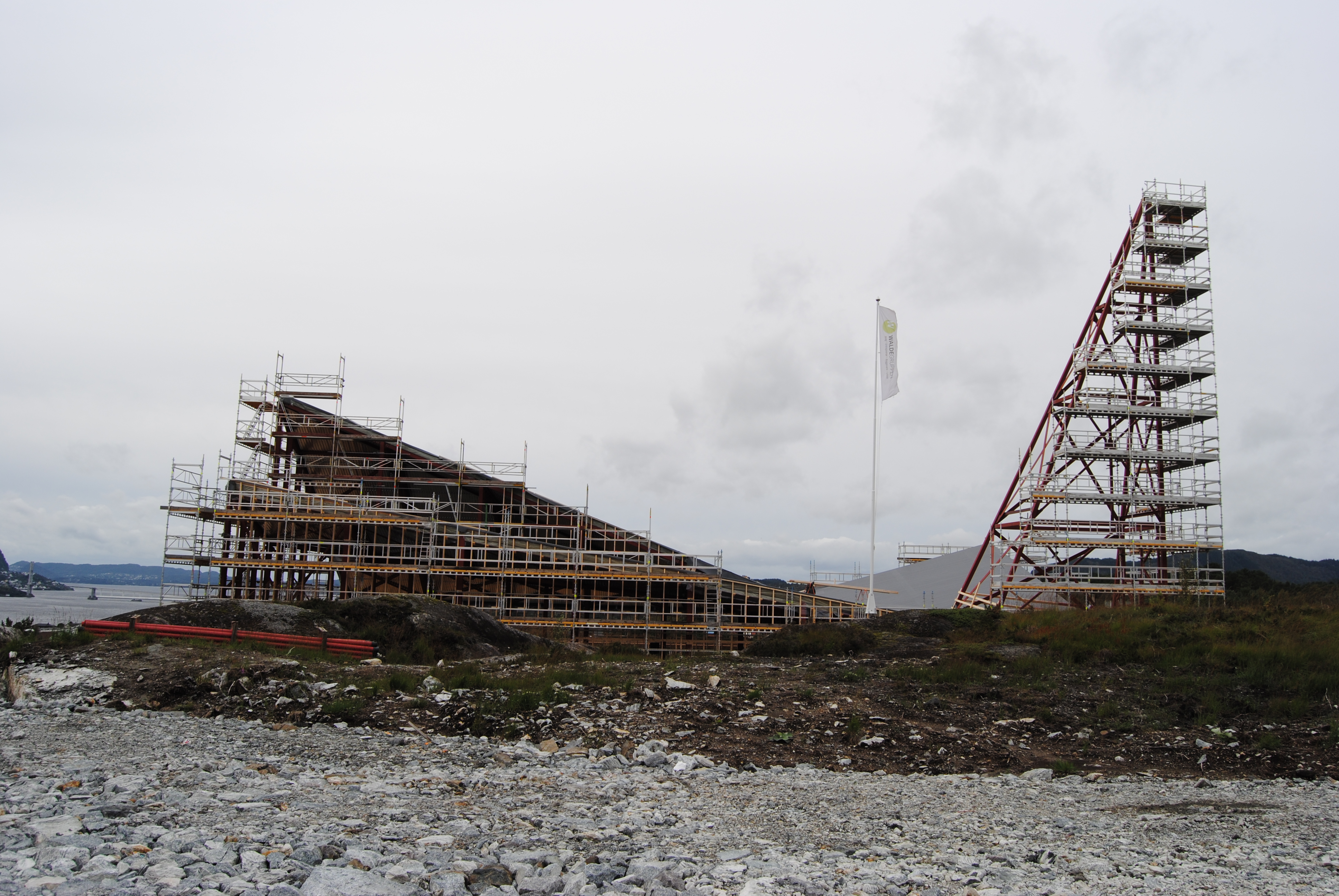
Exterior construction

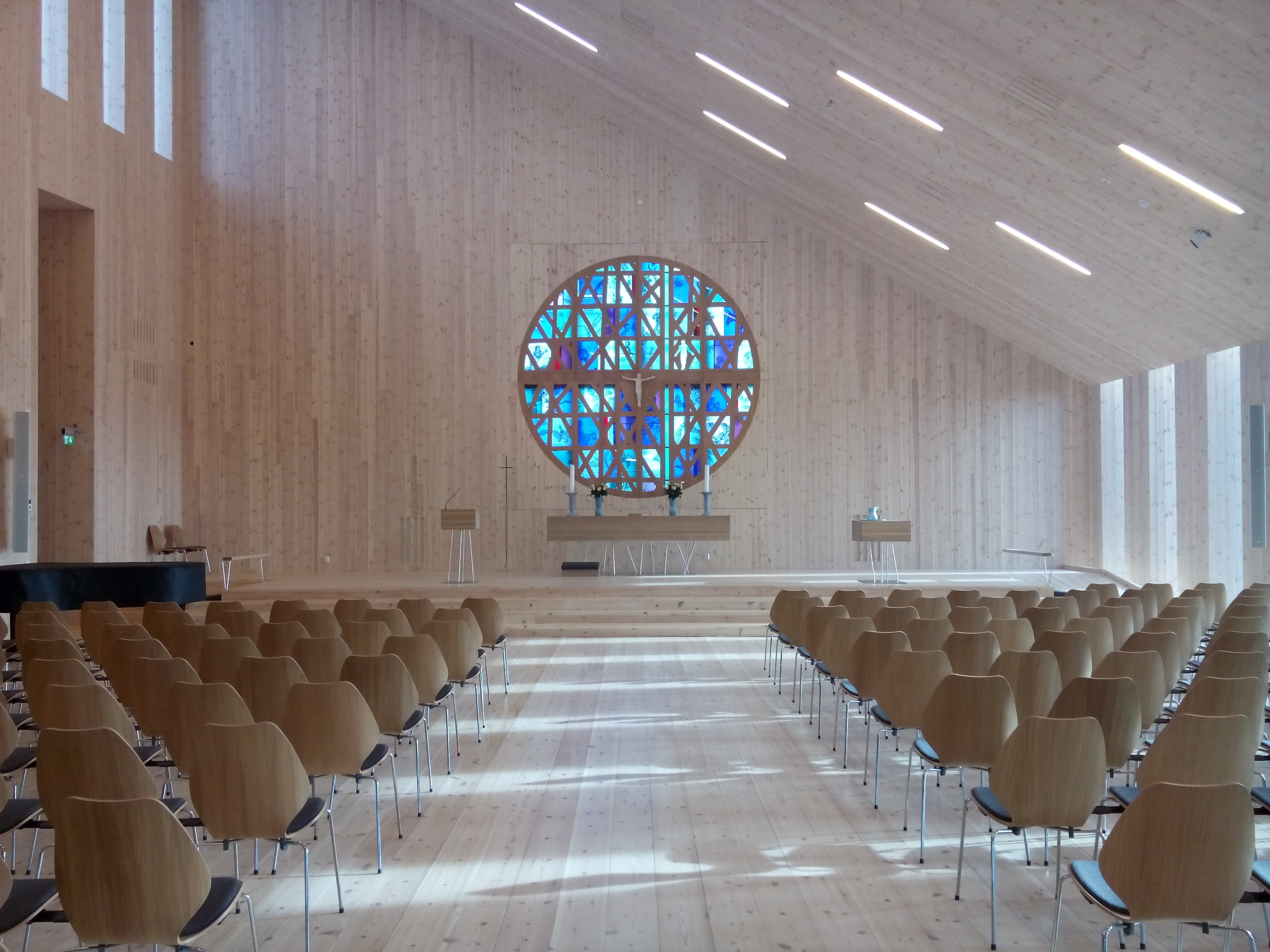
Interior

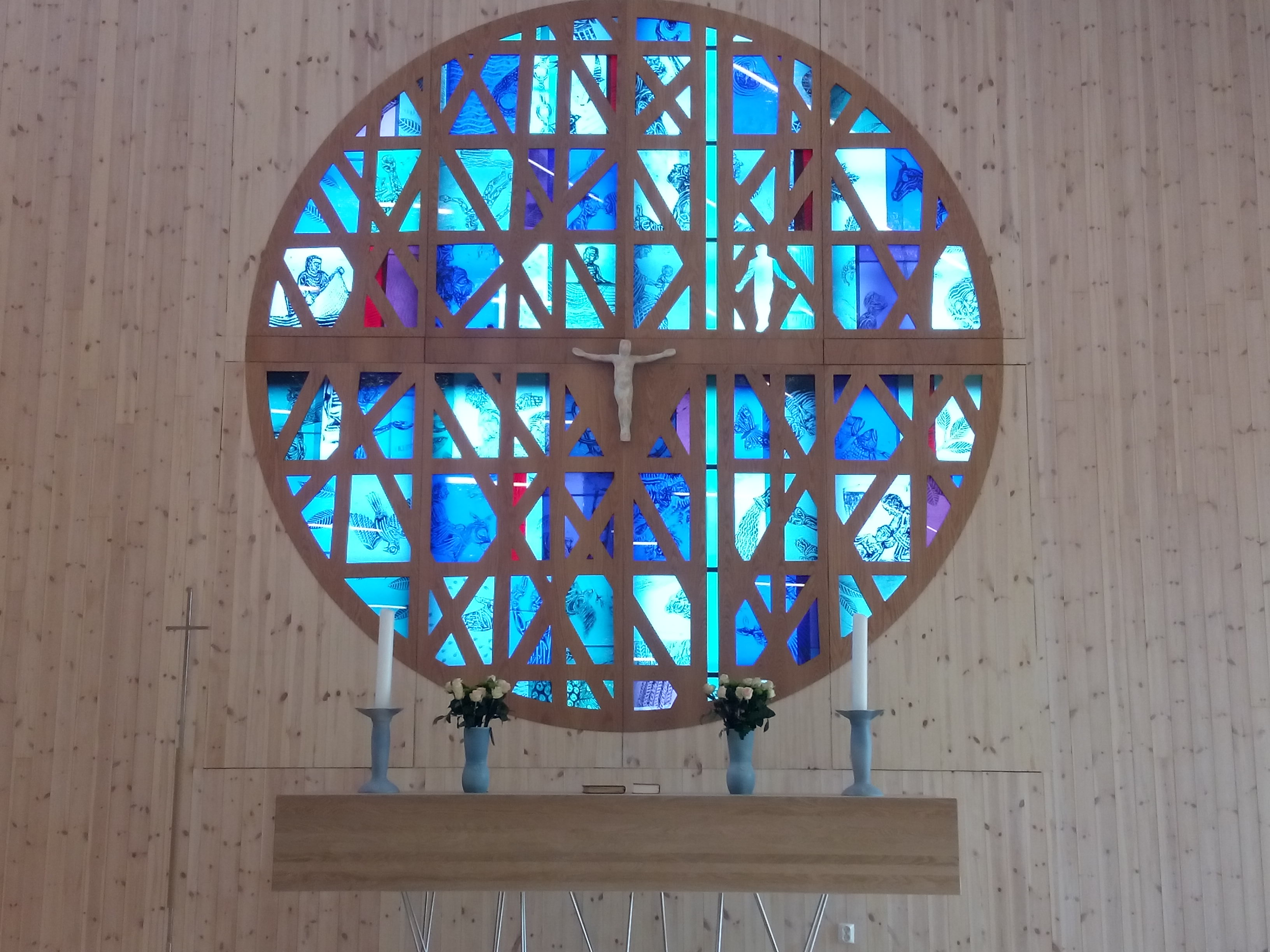
Front window

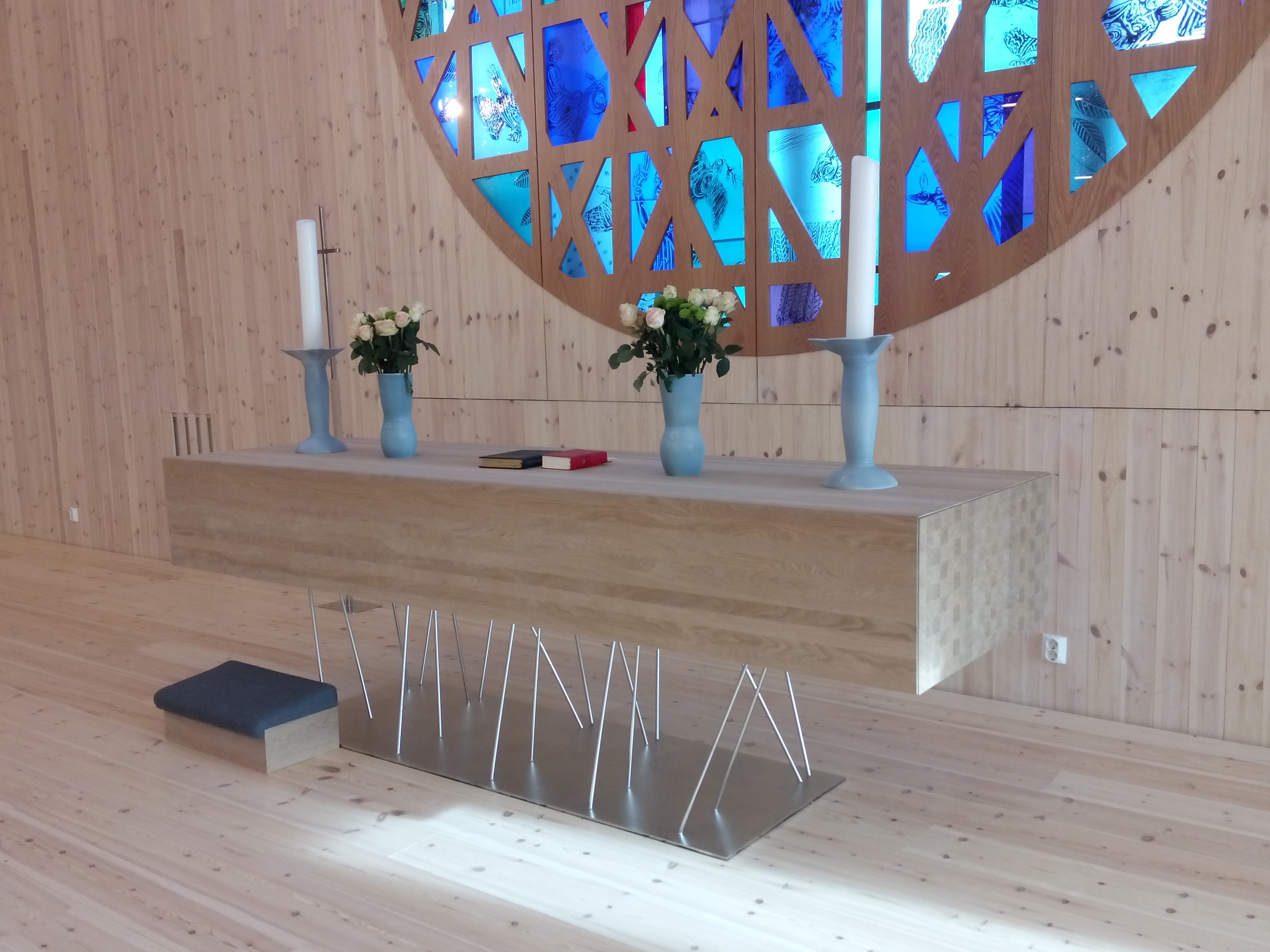
Altar

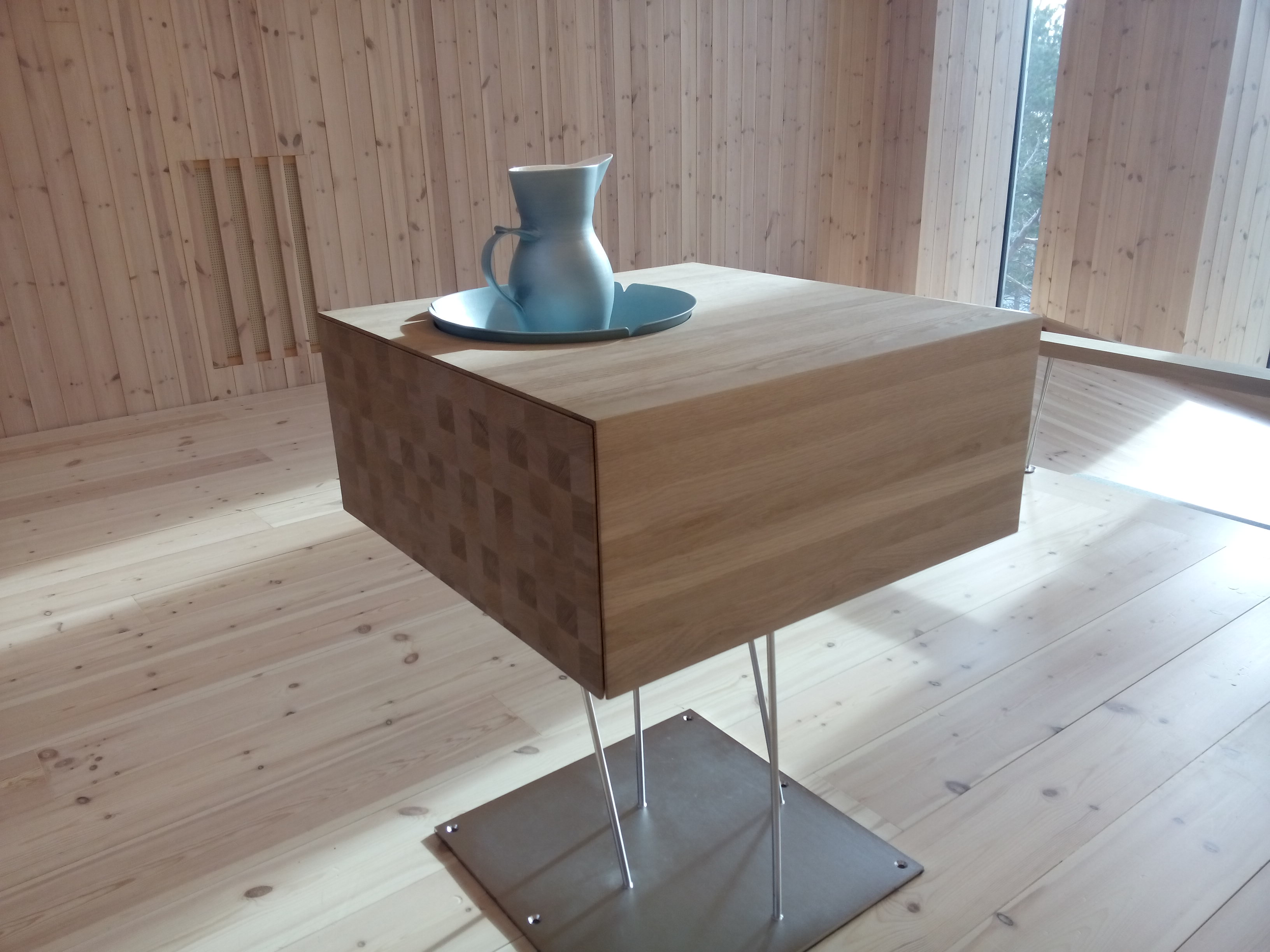
Baptismal font

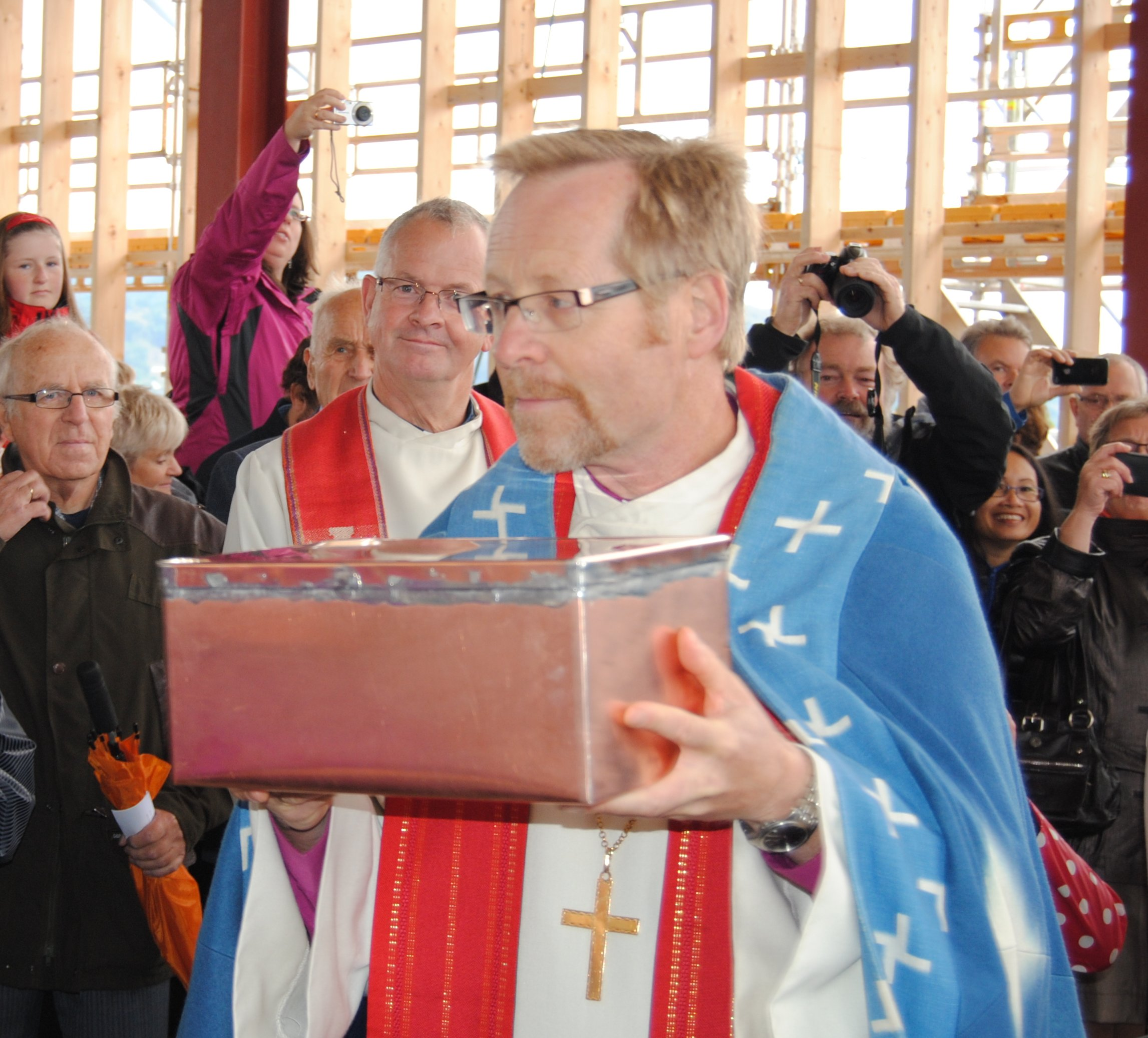
Bishop with foundation stone

== See also ==
- List of churches in Bjørgvin
