= Bulk reagent dispenser =

Laboratory equipment to dispense liquids

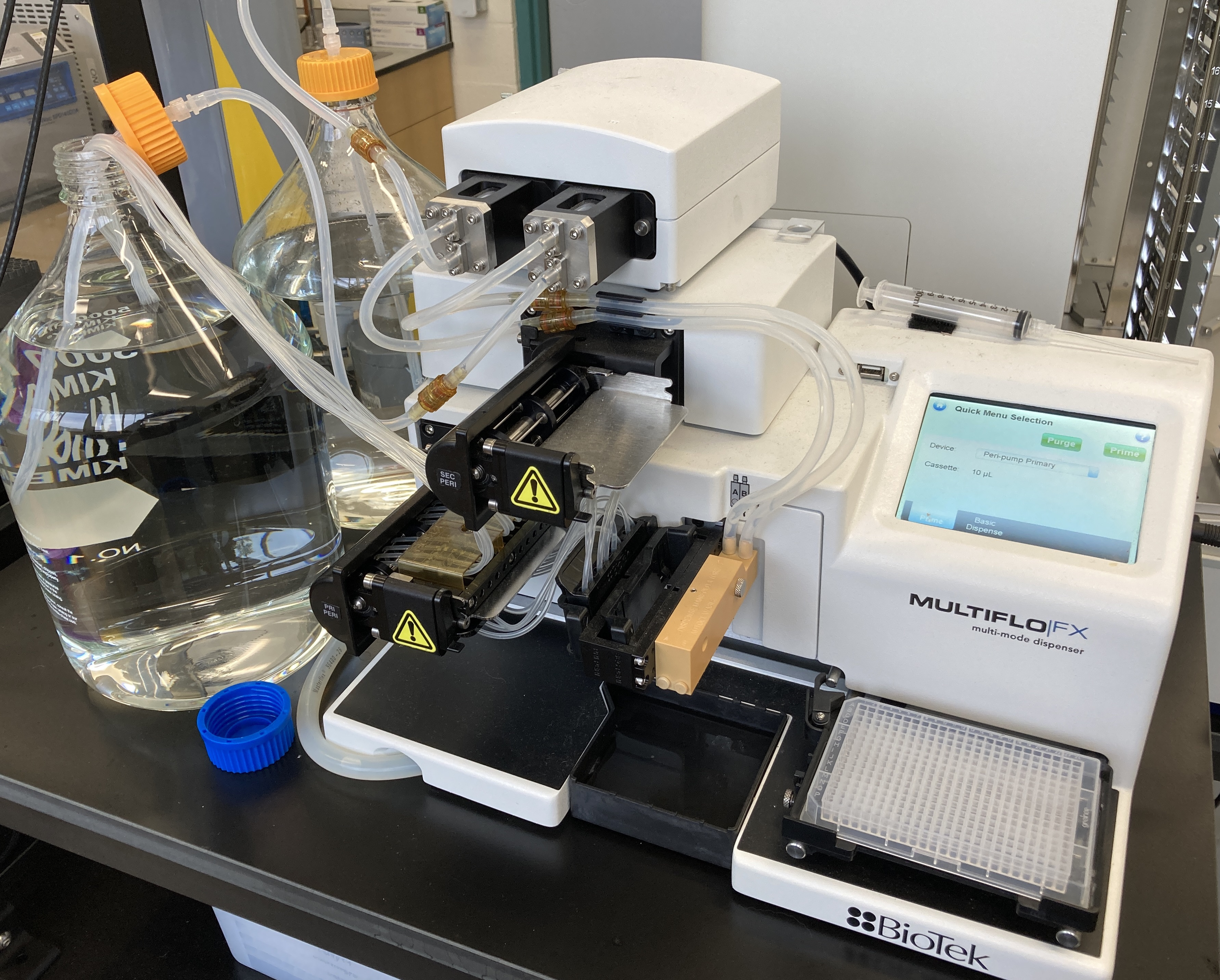
Photograph of a BioTek MultiFlo FX bulk reagent dispenser

A bulk reagent dispenser (BRD) is a type of commercially available laboratory equipment that dispenses liquid reagents in an automated fashion into microplates, multiwell plates, or microplate-like reservoirs, and specifically have the ability to transfer liquid from a "bulk" (i.e. >1L) source reservoir, but still dispense a programmable but relatively small volume of liquid, i.e. 10-500 μL. They are often used in drug discovery or pharmaceutical laboratories. They are distinguished from semi-automated or manual (hand-operated) equipment like pipettes, as well as from automated laboratory equipment that dispenses from relatively small source reservoirs (~10-500 μL) such as acoustic liquid handlers or liquid handling robots.

== History ==
The first bulk reagent dispensers were the Titertek Autodrop and Dynatech Dynadrop MR that were first commercialized in the early 1980s & were used in immunology applications, such as diagnostic experiments to determine viral titer or ELISA assays. Modern examples include the Thermo Multidrop Combi series, or the Agilent (formerly BioTek) MultiFlo and MicroFill series.

== Principles and capabilities ==
=== Pumps ===
Bulk reagent dispensers use the following technologies to transfer liquid:

- Peristaltic pumps, which have the advantage of having a liquid path that can be entirely defined (i.e. silicone tubing), and thus may be able to be used with non-aequeous reagents like certain organic solvents, but have the disadvantage that the pulsatile pressure will often cause aerosolization & large droplet formation of the dispensed liquid, and generally transfers using a peristaltic pump have a higher CV than alternatives.
- Syringe pumps, which use a syringe & check valves to deliver liquid with a more constant pressure and lower CV than peristaltic pumps.

=== Channels & tips ===
Bulk reagent dispensers also have channels and tips for dispensing liquid. Based on the 8-row or 12-column configuration of standard microplates, all modern bulk reagent dispensers currently have either:

- 8-channel dispense tips (horizontal traversal to fill a microplate) or
- 12-channel dispense tips (vertical traversal to fill a microplate)

=== Manifolds ===
Beyond the style and number of independent pumps, channels, and tips, BRDs also might use a manifold to distribute liquid:

- with a manifold (1-inlet per multiple dispense tips, common with syringe pump BRDs), or
- no manifold (one-inlet per each-channel, and one-channel per each tip, common with peristaltic pump BRDs).

If either the fluid inlet or dispense tips become partially or fully clogged, the performance of the BRD will become degraded in distinct and potentially subtle ways depending on if a manifold was used or not.

=== Movement axes ===
Bulk reagent dispensers require moving the dispense tips across the target wells, such that a relatively small number of pumps and tips can fill a large number of microplate wells. But even still, there are a few varieties:

- 2-axis movement using an X-Z gantry. If using a 2-axis BRD, it can only fill microplates or multiwell plates with a well-spacing that is equal to or greater than the spacing of the dispense tips. For example, a BRD with 8-channel tips is meant to fill 96-well plates, but it could also fill a 24-well multiwell plate, or a "single well" plate (i.e. a reservoir).
- 3-axis movement using an X-Y-Z gantry. If using a 3-axis BRD, it can fill microplates or multiwell plates with a well-spacing that is equal to, greater than, or less than the spacing of the dispense tips. For example, a BRD with 8-channel tips is meant to fill 96-well plates, but could fill a 384-well plate by moving the tips (or plate) in the Y axis.

It is worth mentioning, that for reasons of space & presumably mechanical design constraints, the degrees of freedom of movement for a BRD are typically spread across both the tips and the microplate. I.e. the microplate is moved in the X dimension, while the tips move in the Z (and Y) dimension(s).
