= Hawaiian Ecosystems at Risk project =

Info and tech project (funded 1997–2012)

The Hawaiian Ecosystems at Risk project (HEAR) was a government-funded project created to provide technology, methods, and information to decision-makers, resource managers, and the general public to help support effective science-based management of harmful non-native species (invasive species) in Hawaii and the Pacific Rim. Created in 1997, funding ended on 31 December 2012, and its website was last updated on 17 May 2013. One of the HEAR sub-websites, Pacific Island Ecosystems at Risk (PIER), was maintained on a strictly volunteer basis for a few years, until a final update on 2 June 2018.

== Origin and history ==
HEAR originated at the Haleakala Field Station (Maui, Hawaii) of the Pacific Island Ecosystems Research Center (PIERC) of the USGS's Biological Resources Division (formerly the National Biological Service) through the Pacific Cooperative Studies Unit (PSCU) based at the University of Hawaii Department of Botany.

== Funding and support ==
As of late 2012, the Hawaiian Ecosystems at Risk project was funded by the Hauoli Mau Loa Foundation and the U.S. Forest Service with support from the Pacific Cooperative Studies Unit (PCSU) of the University of Hawaii at Manoa. Historically, HEAR had also received funding or support from the Pacific Basin Information Node (PBIN) of the National Biological Information Infrastructure (NBII) through the Pacific Island Ecosystems Research Center of USGS, the Hawaii Conservation Studies Unit (HCSU) of the University of Hawaii at Hilo, Haleakala National Park, and the U.S. Fish and Wildlife Service.

== Partnerships ==
The Hawaiian Ecosystems at Risk project (HEAR) functioned by working collaboratively as a partnership with other organizations, including:

- U.S. Forest Service
- Pacific Cooperative Studies Unit of the University of Hawaii
- Pacific Basin Information Node (NBII)
- Pacific Island Ecosystems Research Center (USGS)
- Global Invasive Species Information Network

== See also ==
- Invasive species in Hawaii
- Invasive species in the United States
