= Reiulf Ramstad Arkitekter =

Architecture and design firm in Norway

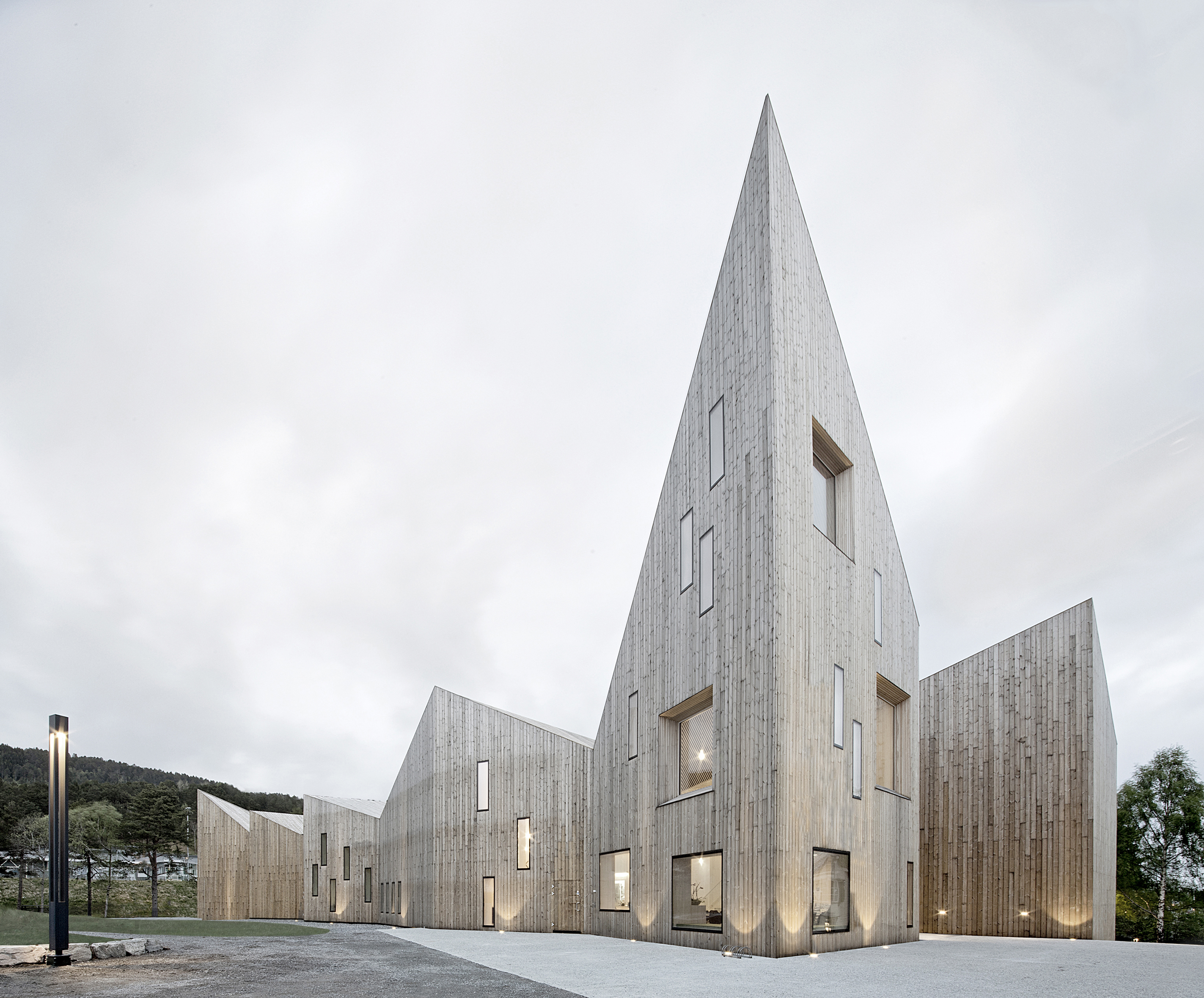
- Romsdal Folk Museum in Molde

Practice information
- Key architects: Reiulf Ramstad (founder, design director); Kristin Stokke Ramstad (managing director, associated partner); Anja H. Strandskogen (architect, associated partner); Christian Skram Fuglset (architect, associated partner)
- Founded: 1995
- Location: Oslo, Norway

Website
- https://www.reiulframstadarkitekter.com/

Reiulf Ramstad Arkitekter (RRA) is a Norwegian architecture, landscape architecture, and design firm based in Oslo.

Founded by Reiulf Ramstad, the firm has a permanent staff of 16. Reiulf Ramstad is internationally known for their work in Norway, with clients like Husbanken and Oslo Sporveier. RRA’s designs range from private residential to large civic works, such as schools, restaurants, public transit stations, museums, and tourist routes. Using biomimetic and natural materials, the firm's main goal is to create unique buildings derived from logical thinking and decision-making.

RRA is affiliated with the Association of Norwegian Architects.

== History ==
In 1995, Reiulf Ramstad graduated from the Venice School of Architecture and founded Reiulf Ramstad Arkitekter AS firm. In its first 15 years, RRA participated in some 35 open architectural design competitions, often placing first prize. Competition designs included hotels, shopping centers, museums, colleges, and other civic centers. Among constructed prize works are the firm’s 2004 proposal for the Metro Oslo Carl Berner, and the 1998 Customs Administration and Office Building at the Gardermoen National Airport. RRA has also worked on small-scale housing projects, such as the 2002 Villa Drammen.

Reiulf Ramstad Arkitekter has gained considerable attention after the 2012 completion of the Trollstigen National Tourist Route project, now one of Norway’s most visited tourist destinations. Since then, RRA has won numerous awards and recognitions, including the 2012 Norwegian Concrete Award and two nominations for the Mies van der Rohe Award. Currently, the firm has 27 employees, including a permanent staff of graduate architects, one managing director, 2 administrative staff, and 2–4 permanent openings for architectural students. Reiulf Ramstad is RRA founder and Design Director, since January 2017 he his accompanied by 3 Associated Partners.

== Practice ==
Reiulf Ramstad Arkitekter sets out to create contemporary architecture based on careful analysis and planning, taking account of the location of each project while combining research with an innovative approach. Rather than employing typical problem-solving methods, the firm frequently develops its own solutions.

=== Style ===
Influenced by architects like Carlo Scarpa and Sverre Fehn, Reiulf Ramstad Arkitekter style has been classified as revitalized Nordic. In order to break away from traditional Nordic architecture, RRA draws on natural materials to create different views of nature for users. The firm seeks to establish a new style of Nordic architecture and new ways of experiencing natural areas in their projects.

=== Design integration ===
Taking a multidisciplinary approach centred on architecture, the firm also undertakes landscaping work, such as their 2012 cemetery grounds proposal for the Trondheim Church Council, and interior design including furniture. In 2002, the firm won the Museum of Decorative Arts and Design’s competition for the permanent exhibition, "Design and Craft 1905–2005", covering the history of arts and crafts in Norway. RRA’s furniture designs, such as their wooden chairs, have been displayed in national and international exhibitions.

== Projects ==
=== Trollstigen National Tourist Route ===
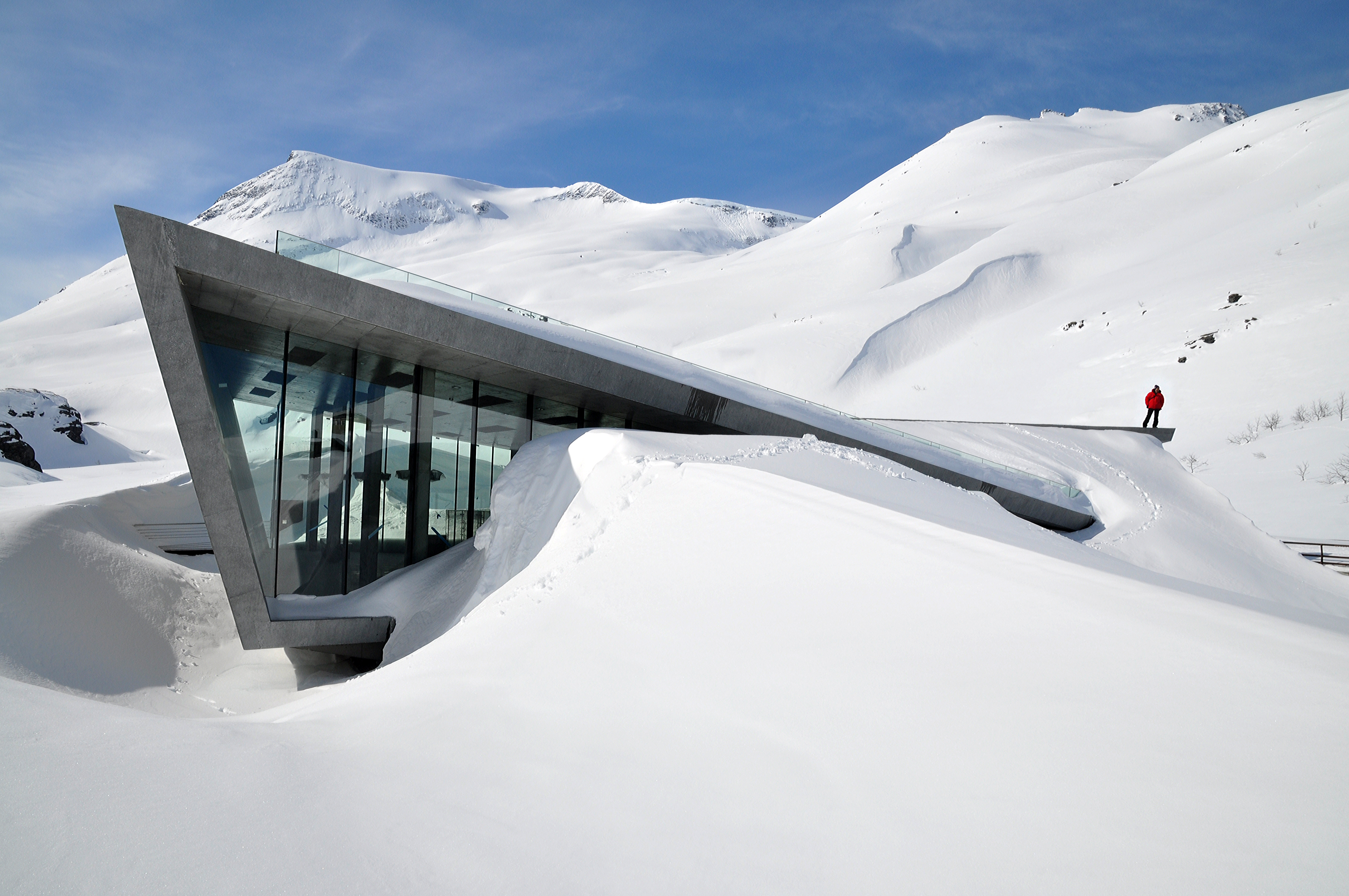
Trollstigen Visitor Center

One of Reiulf Ramstad Arkitekters better known projects rests on the Trollstigen plateau and is part of the National Tourist Route. Completed in 2012, the project was the winner of a 2004 competition held by the Norwegian Public Roads Administration.

The structures take up approximately 20,000 square feet on their 2 million square foot landscape, also designed by RRA. They are composed mainly of treated, cast-in-place concrete and corten steel. Although the area can accumulate up to 23 feet of snow, the structures are highly stress-resistant, yet slender. The Tourist Route has been recognized for its environmental design, using durable, sustainable, and locally sourced materials. The project is now one of Norway’s most popular attractions.

=== Other notable works ===
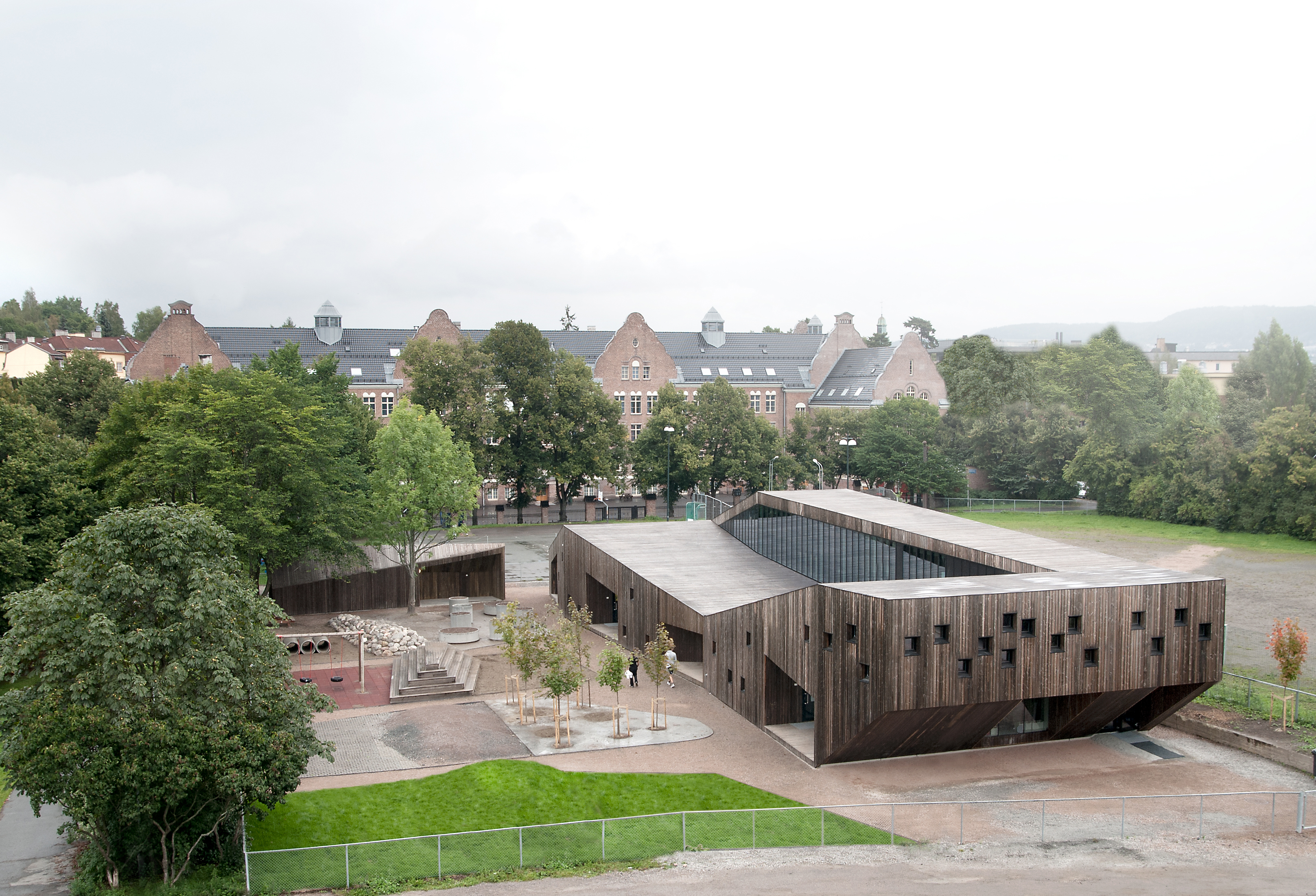
Fagerborg Kindergarten

- 2020 : Breitenbach Landscape Hote (48°Nord) - Breitenbach, France
- 2020 : Kornets Hus - House of Grain - Hjørring, Denmark
- 2020 : Pilestredet 77-79 - Oslo, Norway
- 2019 : Chemin des Carrières - Rosheim, France
- 2019 : Villa Ask - Oslo, Norway
- 2019 : Bygdøynesveien 15 - Oslo, Norway
- 2017 : Miami Sweet Bird South – Miami, USA
- 2017 : Gjøvik University College - Gjøvik, Norway
- 2016 : Romsdal Folk Museum – Molde, Norway
- 2016 : Norwegian Mountaineering Center – Åndalsnes, Norway
- 2015 : V10 Apartments – Oslo, Norway
- 2015 : Cultural Center Stjørdal (Kimen) – Stjørdal, Nord-Trondelag, Norway
- 2014 : Knarvik Community Church – Knarvik, Hordaland, Norway
- 2013 : Split View Mountain Lodge – Havsdalen, Buskerud, Norway
- 2012 : Recycling Plant ISI – Baerum, Oslo, Norway
- 2012 : Trollstigen Visitor Center – Møre og Romsdal, Norway
- 2012 : Selvika National Tourist Route – Finnmark, Norway
- 2011 : Trollwall Restaurant and Service – Trollveggen, Møre og Romsdal, Norway
- 2011 : Summer House – Fuglevik, Norway
- 2010 : Havøysund National Tourist Route – Havøysund, Finnmark, Norway
- 2010 : Fagerbørg Kindergarten – Fagerbørg, Oslo, Norway
- 2010 : Korsgata 5 Urban Apartments – Grünerløkka, Norway
- 2008 : Villa Heshtagen Asker – Oslo, Norway
- 2006 : Østfold University College – Østfold, Norway
- 2006 : Inside-Out Cabin – Papper, Hvaler Islands
- 2004 : Villa on a Slope – Oslo, Norway
- 2003 : Villa Holmenkollen – Holmenkollen, Oslo, Norway

== Reception ==
Reiulf Ramstad Arkitekter has frequently received positive reviews for its work on many different types of buildings and has been mentioned in national and global magazines. The firm has also collaborated with several authors on books about the firm. Reiulf Ramstad has collaborated with Boris Jensen and Hatje Cantz on his biography.

== Awards ==
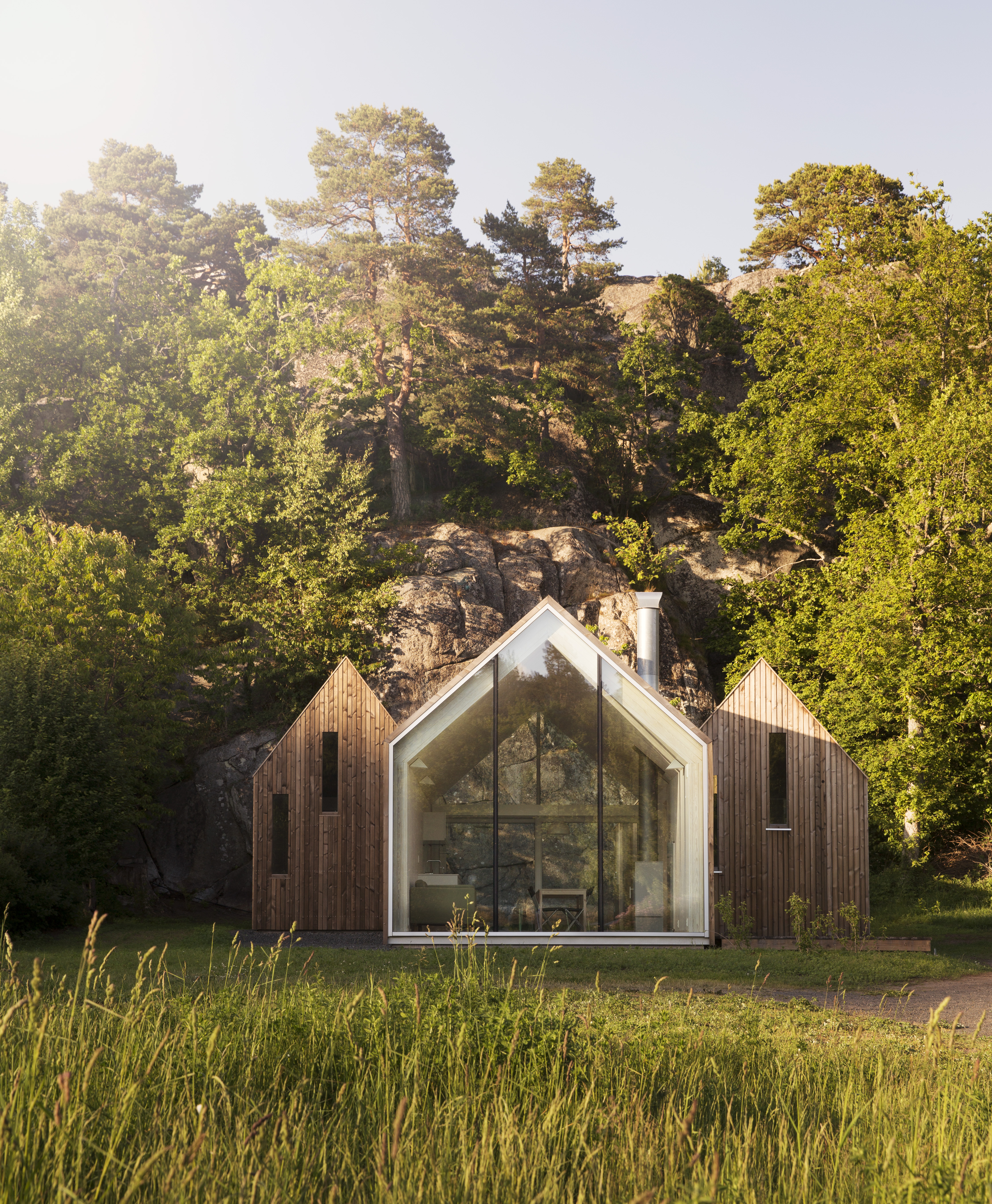
Micro Cluster Cabins

- 2013: Norwegian Steel Award – Trollstigen National Tourist Route
- 2013: European Steel Construction Award – Trollstigen National Tourist Route
- 2012: Norwegian Concrete Award – Trollstigen National Tourist Route
- 2009: ArchDaily Building of the Year – Trollstigen National Tourist Route
