= Plate reader =

Laboratory instrument

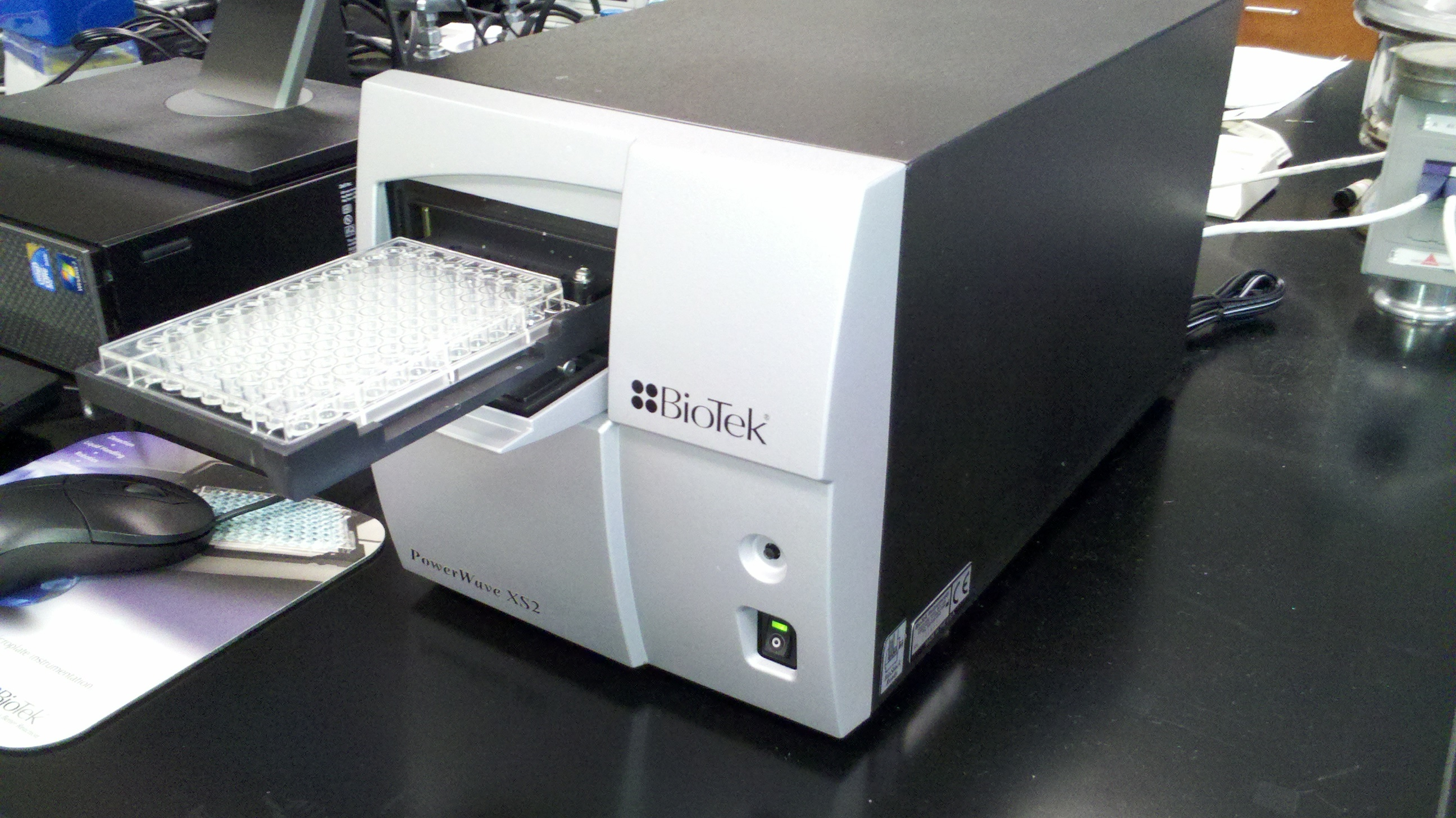
BioTek PowerWave XS Microplate Reader

Plate readers, also known as microplate readers or microplate photometers, are instruments which are used to detect biological, chemical or physical events of samples in microtiter plates. They are widely used in research, drug discovery, bioassay validation, quality control and manufacturing processes in the pharmaceutical and biotechnological industry and academic organizations. Sample reactions can be assayed in 1-1536 well format microtiter plates. The most common microplate format used in academic research laboratories or clinical diagnostic laboratories is 96-well (8 by 12 matrix) with a typical reaction volume between 100 and 200 μL per well. Higher density microplates (384- or 1536-well microplates) are typically used for screening applications, when throughput (number of samples per day processed) and assay cost per sample become critical parameters, with a typical assay volume between 5 and 50 μL per well. Common detection modes for microplate assays are absorbance, fluorescence intensity, luminescence, time-resolved fluorescence, and fluorescence polarization.

== Methods ==
=== Absorbance ===
Absorbance detection has been available in microplate readers for more than 3 decades and is used for assays such as ELISA assays, protein and nucleic acid quantification or enzyme activity assays (i.e. in the MTT assay for cell viability). A light source illuminates the sample using a specific wavelength (selected by an optical filter, or a monochromator), and a light detector located on the other side of the well measures how much of the initial (100%) light is transmitted through the sample: the amount of transmitted light will typically be related to the concentration of the molecule of interest. Several conventional colorimetric analyses have been miniaturized to function quantitatively in a plate reader, with performance suitable for research purposes. Examples of analyses converted to plate reader methods include several for ammonium, nitrate, nitrite, urea, iron(II), and orthophosphate. More recent colorimetric chemistries have been developed directly for use in plate readers.

=== Fluorescence ===
Fluorescence intensity detection has developed very broadly in the microplate format over the last two decades. The range of applications is much broader than when using absorbance detection, but the instrumentation is usually more expensive. In this type of instrumentation, a first optical system (excitation system) illuminates the sample using a specific wavelength (selected by an optical filter, or a monochromator). As a result of the illumination, the sample emits light (it fluoresces) and a second optical system (emission system) collects the emitted light, separates it from the excitation light (using a filter or monochromator system), and measures the signal using a light detector such as a photomultiplier tube (PMT). The advantages of fluorescence detection over absorbance detection are sensitivity, as well as application range, given the wide selection of fluorescent labels available today. For example, a technique known as calcium imaging measures the fluorescence intensity of calcium-sensitive dyes to assess intracellular calcium levels.

=== Luminescence ===
Luminescence is the result of a chemical or biochemical reaction. Luminescence detection is simpler optically than fluorescence detection because luminescence does not require a light source for excitation or optics for selecting discrete excitation wavelengths. A typical luminescence optical system consists of a light-tight reading chamber and a PMT detector. Some plate readers use an Analog PMT detector while others have a photon counting PMT detector. Photon Counting is widely accepted as the most sensitive means of detecting luminescence. Some plate readers offer filter wheel or tunable wavelength monochromator optical systems for selecting specific luminescent wavelengths. The ability to select multiple wavelengths, or even wavelength ranges, allows for detection of assays that contain multiple luminescent reporter enzymes, the development of new luminescence assays, as well as a means to optimize the signal to noise ratio.

Common applications include luciferase -based gene expression assays, as well as cell viability, cytotoxicity, and biorhythm assays based on the luminescent detection of ATP.

=== Time-resolved fluorescence (TRF) ===
Time-resolved fluorescence (TRF) measurement is very similar to fluorescence intensity (FI) measurement. The only difference is the timing of the excitation/measurement process. When measuring FI, the excitation and emission processes are simultaneous: the light emitted by the sample is measured while excitation is taking place. Even though emission systems are very efficient at removing excitation light before it reaches the detector, the amount of excitation light compared to emission light is such that FI measurements always exhibit fairly elevated background signals. TRF offers a solution to this issue. It relies on the use of very specific fluorescent molecules, called lanthanides, that have the unusual property of emitting over long periods of time (measured in milliseconds) after excitation, when most standard fluorescent dyes (e.g. fluorescein) emit within a few nanoseconds of being excited. As a result, it is possible to excite lanthanides using a pulsed light source (Xenon flash lamp or pulsed laser for example) and measure after the excitation pulse. This results in lower measurement backgrounds than in standard FI assays. The drawbacks are that the instrumentation and reagents are typically more expensive, and that the applications have to be compatible with the use of these very specific lanthanide dyes. The main use of TRF is found in drug screening applications, under a form called TR-FRET (time-resolved fluorescence energy transfer). TR-FRET assays are very robust (limited sensitivity to several types of assay interference) and are easily miniaturized. Robustness, the ability to automate and miniaturize are features that are highly attractive in a screening laboratory.

=== Fluorescence polarization ===
Fluorescence polarization measurement is also very close to FI detection. The difference is that the optical system includes polarizing filters on the light path: the samples in the microplate are excited using polarized light (instead of non-polarized light in FI and TRF modes). Depending on the mobility of the fluorescent molecules found in the wells, the light emitted will either be polarized or not. For example, large molecules (e.g. proteins) in solution, which rotate relatively slowly because of their size, will emit polarized light when excited with polarized light. On the other hand, the fast rotation of smaller molecules will result in a depolarization of the signal. The emission system of the plate reader uses polarizing filters to analyze the polarity of the emitted light. A low level of polarization indicates that small fluorescent molecules move freely in the sample. A high level of polarization indicates that fluorescent is attached to a larger molecular complex. As a result, one of the basic applications of FP detection is molecular binding assays, since they allow to detect if a small fluorescent molecule binds (or not) to a larger, non-fluorescent molecule: binding results in a slower rotation speed of the fluorescent molecule, and in an increase in the polarization of the signal.

=== Light scattering and nephelometry ===
Light scattering and nephelometry are methods for the determination of the cloudiness of a solution (i.e.: insoluble particles in a solution). A light beam passes through the sample and the light is scattered by the suspended particles. The measured forward scattered light indicates the amount of the insoluble particles present in solution. Common nephelometry/light scattering applications include automated HTS drug solubility screening, long-term microbial growth kinetics, flocculation, aggregation and the monitoring of polymerization and precipitation, including immunoprecipitation.

== Instruments and assays ==
Many of the detection modes (absorbance, fluorescence intensity, luminescence, time-resolved fluorescence, and fluorescence polarization) are available stand-alone in dedicated plate readers, but are very often found today combined into one instrument (multi-mode plate reader). There are also instruments for measuring the dynamic or static light scattered from samples in a microplate. The range of applications for multi-mode plate readers is extremely large. Some of the most common assays are:

- ELISAs
- Protein and cell growth assays
- Protein–protein interaction
- Reporter assays
- Nucleic acid quantitation
- Molecular interactions
- Enzyme activity
- Cell toxicity, proliferation, and viability
- ATP quantification
- Immunoassays
- High throughput screening of compounds and targets in drug discovery (Labeled Alpha Screen on most instruments)
- Bead-based epitope assay
- Cellular uptake of nanoparticles

While "plate reader" usually refers to the devices described above, many variations are available. Some examples of other devices working with the microplate format are:

- ELISPOT plate readers, used to count the colored spots that are formed in the course of ELISPOT assays.
- High-throughput imagers that can measure all the wells of a microplate at once
- High-content screening (HCS) systems that image each well with high resolution, to look at cell populations
- Label-free instruments that use specialized microplates to measure binding events without the use of chemical markers
