= BRD Tower Bucharest =

BRD Tower
- Interactive map of the BRD Tower area

General information
- Status: Completed
- Type: Office
- Location: Bucharest, Romania
- Coordinates: 44.45261°N 26.0836°E
- Construction started: 2002
- Opening: 2003
- Cost: US$ 68,000,000
- Owner: BRD - Groupe Société Générale

Height
- Roof: 82 m (269 ft)

Technical details
- Floor count: 19
- Floor area: 37,000 m^{2} (400,000 sq ft)

Design and construction
- Structural engineer: Vinci
- Main contractor: Soconac

BRD Tower is a class A office building located in the city of Bucharest, Romania. It has 19 floors, containing a total of 37,000 m^{2} floor space, making it one of the largest office buildings in Bucharest. There are an additional 3 floors underground that serve as parking space.

== See also ==
- BRD Tower Cluj-Napoca
