= Østfold University College =

Norwegian institution of higher learning

Østfold University of Applied Sciences
- Høgskolen i Østfold
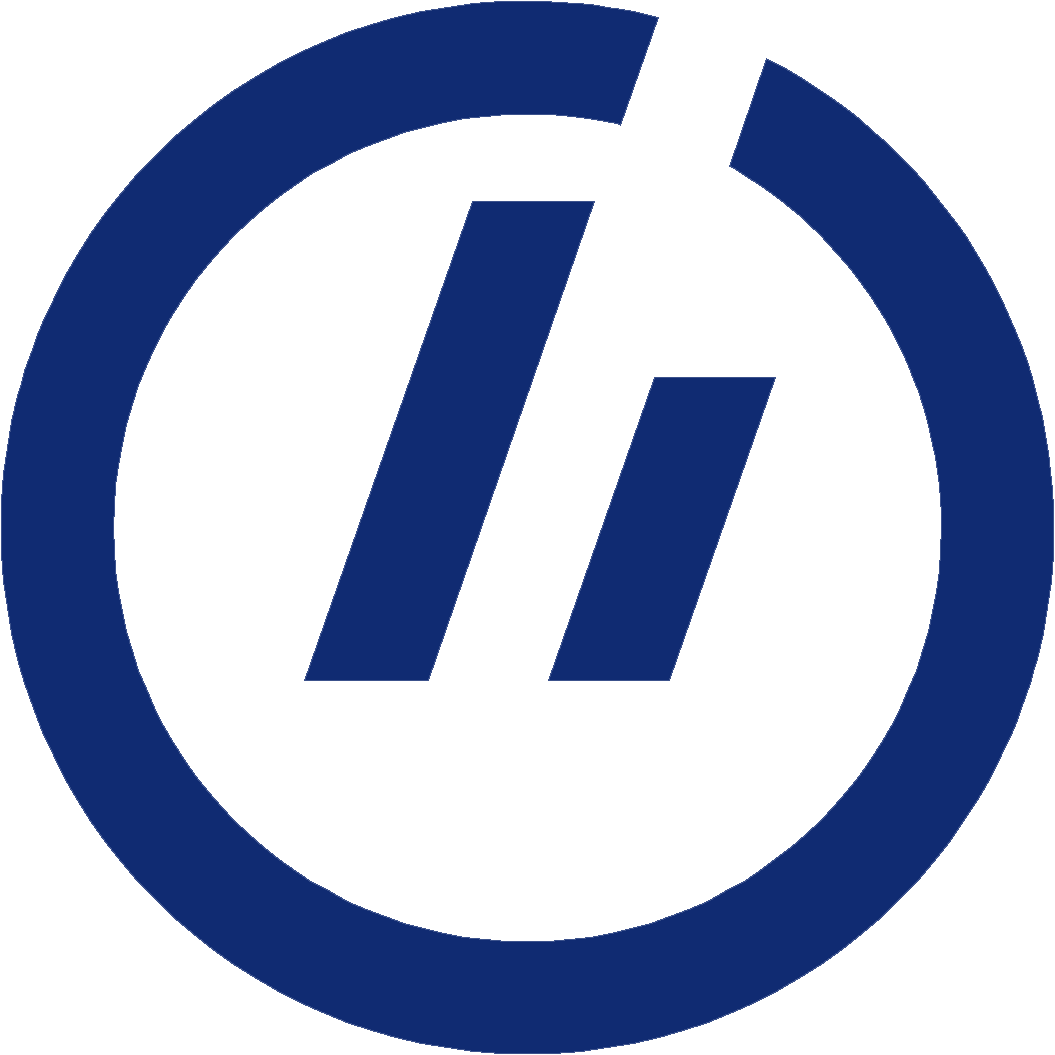
- Logo of Østfold University of Applied Sciences
- Type: University College
- Established: 1994; 32 years ago (1955, 1963, 1965 and 1980)
- Rector: Lars-Petter Jelsness-Jørgensen
- Students: 7000
- Location: Halden and Fredrikstad, Norway; 59°07′46″N 11°21′11″E
- Campus: Urban
- Website: www.hiof.no

Østfold University of Applied Sciences (Norwegian: Høgskolen i Østfold, HiØ) is a university college in Østfold county, Norway. It has campuses in Fredrikstad and Halden, and has around 7000 students (as of 2017) and 550 employees (as of 2017). The university college is one of the public university colleges in Norway, and is a result of five public colleges in Halden, Sarpsborg and Fredrikstad which were joined together as a part of the University College Reform (Norwegian: Høgskolereformen) of 1994.

The school offers over 60 fields of study, ranging from Associate degrees, Bachelor's degrees, Master's degrees, and some Doctorates.

== Faculties ==
Østfold University of Applied Sciences incorporates the following faculties:

- Faculty of Health, Welfare and Organisation
- Faculty of Computer Science, Engineering and Economics
- Faculty of Teacher Education and Languages

== Campus ==
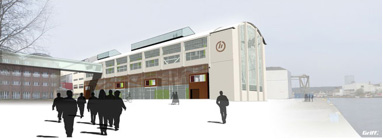
The new addition to the Fredrikstad Campus, "Smia" is home to the Departement of Engineering

HiØ is split between two campuses, one located in Halden, for business, social sciences, foreign language, computer science and education. The other in Fredrikstad, for engineering, health and welfare studies.

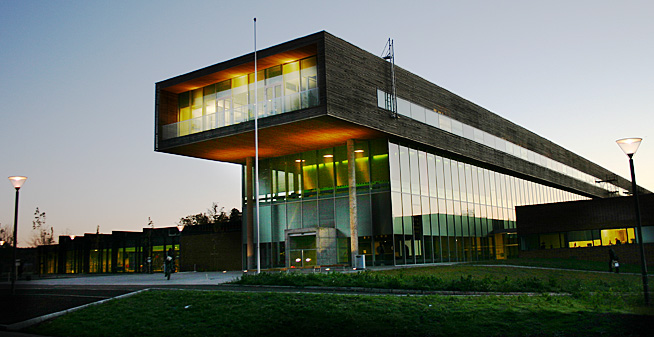
The Halden Campus is home to the Department of Economics, Innovation and Society, Department of Computer Science and Communication and the Faculty of Teacher Education and Languages

The Halden campus, designed by architect firm Reiulf Ramstad Arkitekter, was opened in 2006. The building was nominated by the Norwegian Association of Architects for the Mies van der Rohe-prize.

The Fredrikstad campus is home to approximately 1,600 students and 150 staff. Its newest addition, called "Smia" ("the forge"), was opened for the school's Faculty of Engineering in 2010.

== Academics ==
Østfold University of Applied Sciences was ranked 5th in Norway, and 900th in the World in the 2010 Webometrics Ranking of World Universities. The European Commission awarded the Diploma Supplement Label from 2009 to 2013 to Østfold University College (Høgskolen i Østfold). Of the 26 Norwegian higher education institutions that applied, Østfold University College was one of five that received this distinction of quality.

=== Industrial Design Engineering ===
The Faculty of Engineering offers a 3-year Bachelor's Degree in Industrial Design, that combines the science of engineering with the applied art of design to educate industrial design engineers. Students in this program go on to work as product, interface and transportation designers. The combined degree allows students to identify themselves as both engineers and designers.

NTNU in Trondheim offers a similar 5-year Master's Degree that students can transfer to after graduation and get a 2-year Master's Degree in Industrial Design Engineering. Students will then be able to use the title sivilingeniør, "Master of Engineering".
