= BioTek =

BioTek Instruments
- Company type: Subsidiary
- Industry: Scientific equipment
- Founded: 1968
- Founder: Norman Alpert
- Headquarters: Winooski, Vermont, U.S.
- Area served: Worldwide
- Key people: Briar Alpert, Chairman and CEO
- Products: Microplate readers and related devices and software
- Number of employees: 216 (2023)
- Parent: Agilent Technologies
- Website: BioTek web site

BioTek Instruments was a privately held Vermont–based manufacturer of scientific instruments and associated software used in basic research in the life sciences as well in quality assurance in related industries. The company was founded in 1968 by University of Vermont Medical College physiologist Dr. Norman Alpert and engineer George H. Luhr, who directed the college's instrumentation and model facility. Alpert's son, Briar took over as CEO in 2001. The company manufactures its products at its headquarters in Winooski, Vermont. The site was expanded in 2009, and again in 2017. In 2019 Agilent Technologies acquired Biotek for $1.165 billion. With the acquisition, Biotek's products will provide research on life science with "cost-effective analysis and qualification" over many different applications.

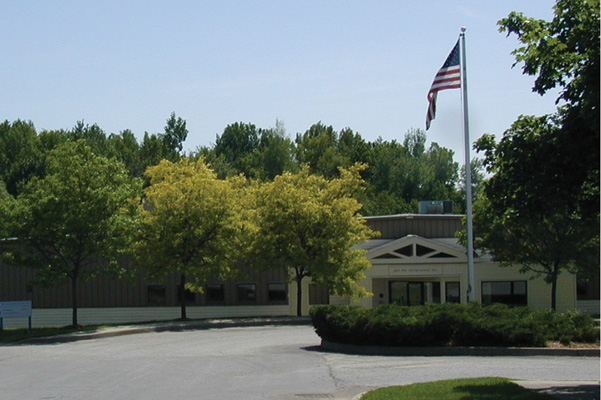
BioTek Instruments headquarters in Winooski, Vermont, USA.

The company originally manufactured devices used to test and calibrate medical equipment, and in the 1980s started to develop then sell microplate readers; in 2002 the company sold off the testing device business to focus on microplates. By 2013 its lines of business included microplate readers, washers, dispensers and related software, as well as related laboratory automation equipment; it was developing a microscopy line as well. As of 2013 it had around 350 employees, with around 250 in Vermont and the rest in sales in other US states and major markets worldwide.

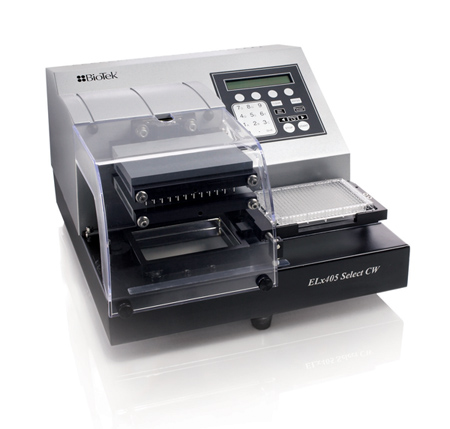
ELx405 Microplate Washer from BioTek Instruments.
