= BRD Tower Cluj-Napoca =

Romanian office building

BRD Tower
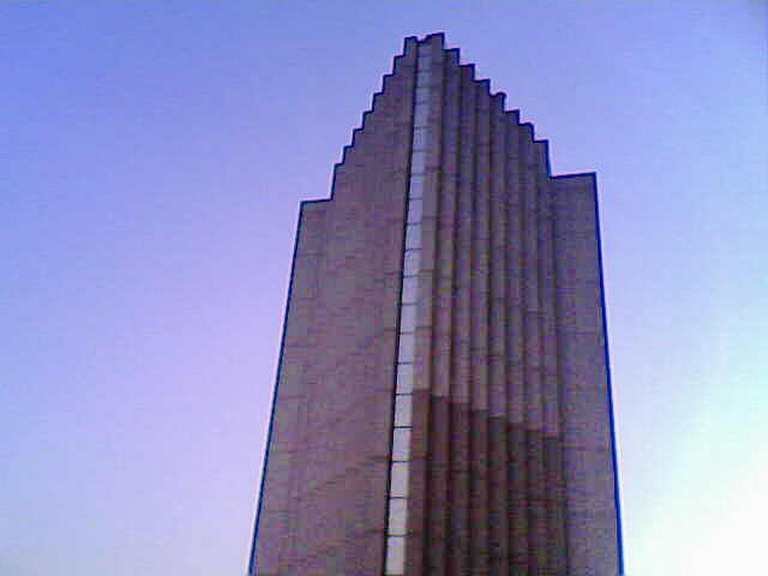
- BRD Tower
- Interactive map of the BRD Tower area

General information
- Status: Completed
- Location: Cluj-Napoca, Romania
- Coordinates: 46.777056°N 23.606046°E
- Opening: 1997
- Owner: BRD - Groupe Société Générale

Height
- Roof: 50 m (160 ft)

Technical details
- Floor count: 12

Design and construction
- Structural engineer: ACI Cluj

BRD Tower is a high-rise office building in Cluj-Napoca, Romania. It was inaugurated in 1997 and stands at 50 m (160 ft) tall with 12 stories and currently serves as the headquarters of the Romanian BRD bank filiale of Cluj-Napoca.

== See also ==
- Contemporary architecture in Cluj-Napoca
- List of tallest buildings in Romania
