= Contemporary architecture in Cluj-Napoca =

Since 1989, modern skyscrapers and glass-fronted hotels have altered the skyline of Cluj-Napoca, a city in the Transylvanian region of Romania.

== Banks ==
The Cluj-Napoca regional headquarters of the Banca Română pentru Dezvoltare (BRD) (Romanian Bank for Development) was completed in 1997 after 4 years of work. It is the second tallest building in Cluj-Napoca (the tallest one being West City Tower), 50 m or 164 feet. Its 12 stories house offices for the bank and for divisions of several other companies, including insurance and oil companies.

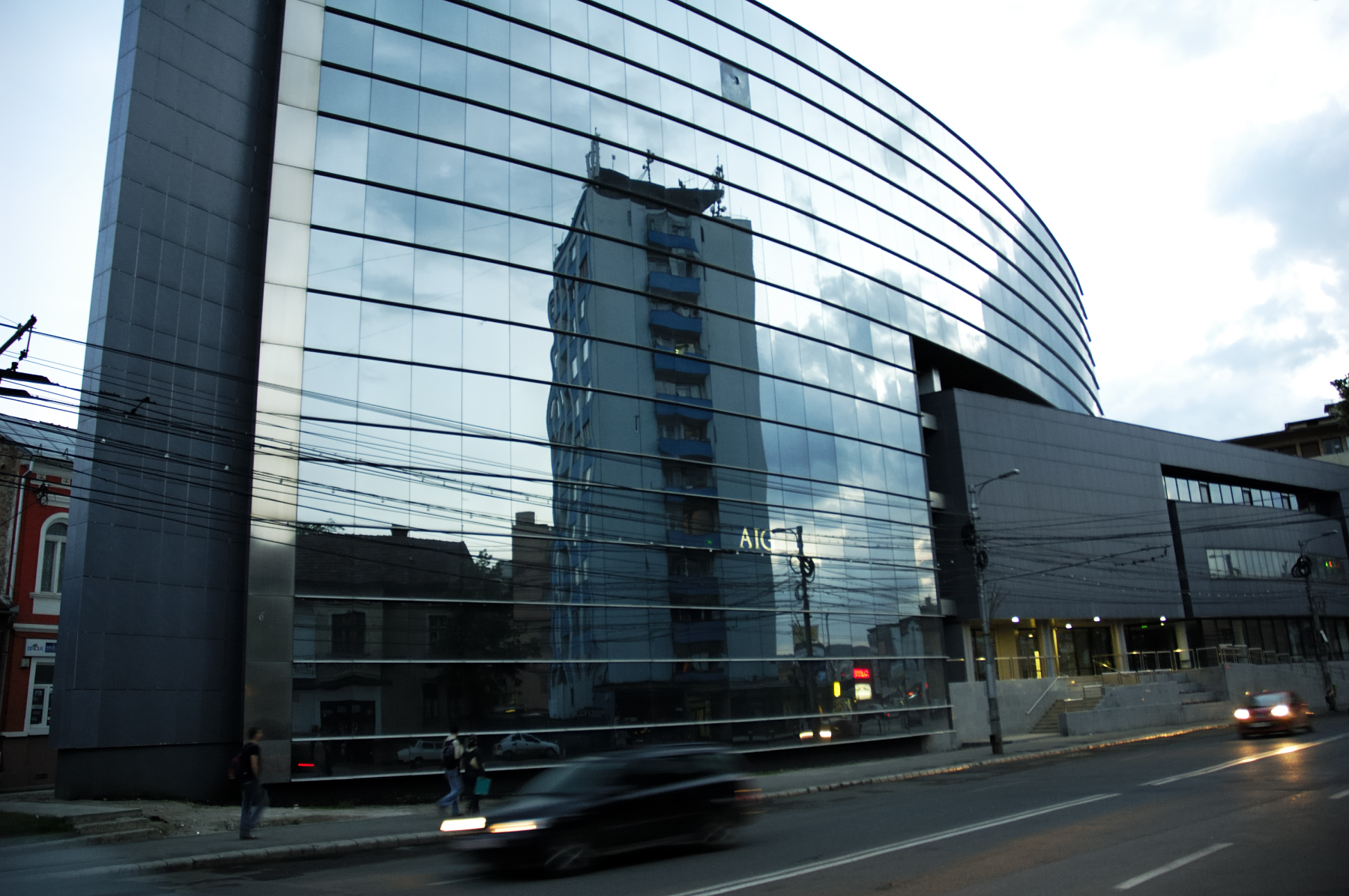
City Business Center known as "Clădirea Biscuite"

Another architecturally interesting building is the unfinished headquarters of the Banca Agricole (Agricultural Bank), held in the custody of the city due to the failure of that bank and its subsequent purchase by the Reiffeisen Bank. Work ceased in 2000; all that was finished was the exterior, built by the Abatech firm. The city government proposed that the building be completed and transformed into the Casa Europei ("House of Europe"), but funds were not obtained to complete work. In 2006, it was announced that the building will be completed as a City Business Center, and work resumed. Today the building is functional and bears the nickname "Clădirea biscuite".

Another building in similar straits is the more recently started behind Palatul Telefoanelor (Telephone Palace; a building of the same name exists in Bucharest), built by Romtelecom (the national, public phone company), who could not afford to finish the building and auctioned it off. It was bought by Banca Transilvania for 3 million euros. The financial institution announced it will be used as a banking café (Romanian: cafenea bancară), the first of its kind in Cluj (however, since the announcement a rival bank, Banc Post, opened such a café).

Other banks that have constructed modern buildings in Cluj-Napoca include Banca Transilvania, Banca Comercială Română, Banc Post, Banca Țiriac, ABN Amro Bank, and UniCredit.

== Other buildings ==
In the more recent years real estate developers have built more buildings as the city experienced economic growth. Iulius Mall opened a big commercial center with a business tower on top in 2007. In 2014 United Business Center was built near Iulius Mall and in Marasti neighborhood a large office complex started being built with the name simply "The Office" which had its phase one completed in 2014 and the entire complex is expected to be finished in 2016.

Many residential buildings started to appear mainly on the city outskirts and in Florești. The most notable area where this is taking place is in Bună Ziua neighborhood.

== Government buildings ==
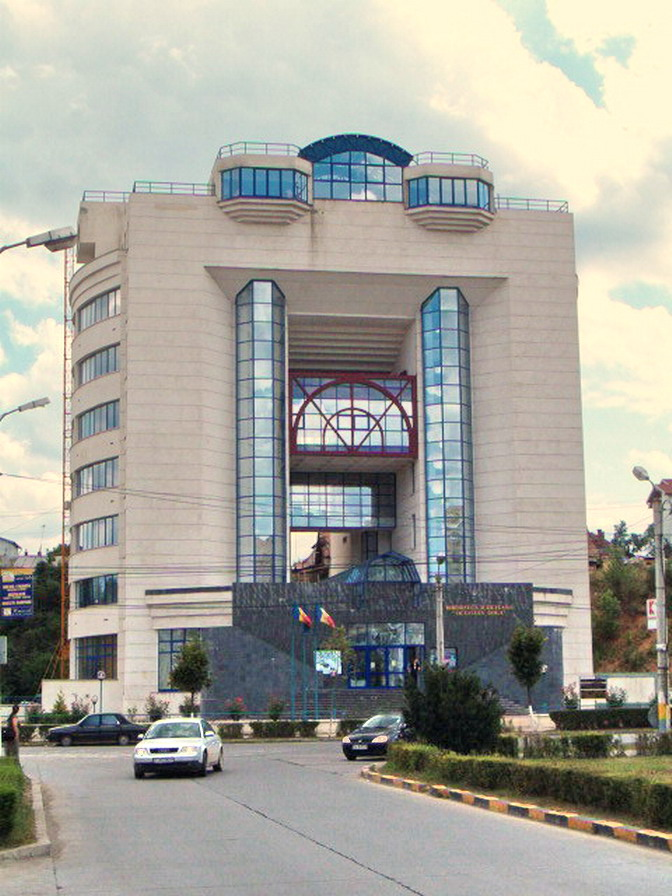
Octavian Goga Library

Besides banks, Cluj-Napoca features several modern buildings constructed under the aegis of the local government. The most recent is the Octavian Goga Library Building, which also houses information centers for the European Union and NATO. This building was started in 2000 and completed in 2003. Other post-Communist-era government buildings include the Avram Iancu Firehouse, Cluj-Napoca International Airport, and the Cluj-Napoca branch of DistriGaz.

== Schools ==
Being an academic center, home of six government universities (Babeş-Bolyai University, Academia de Arte Vizuale "Ion Andreescu", Universitatea de Ştiinţe Agronomice şi Medicină Veterinară, Universitatea Tehnică, Universitatea de Medicină si Farmacie, Academia de Muzică "Gheorghe Dima") and several private ones as well (Universitatea Bogdan Vodă, Universitatea Creştină Dimitrie Cantemir), Cluj-Napoca also features several modern university buildings such as the Department of Political Science at UBB, the Department of Management at UBV, and the Law Department of UCDC.
