= Biological Resources Discipline =

The Biological Resources Discipline (BRD) is a program of the United States Geological Survey (USGS). Its stated task is to work with other stakeholders to provide the scientific understanding and technologies needed to support the sound management and conservation of the United States' biological resources.

== Establishment ==
BRD was created when Secretary of Interior Bruce Babbitt transferred most of the research biologists from the various Bureaus of the Department of the Interior. In 1993, Babbitt established the National Biological Survey (NBS), staffed with more than 1,300 researchers and support personnel reassigned from the Fish and Wildlife Service, with additional scientific personnel from the National Park Service and other Interior agencies. However, Congressional opposition threatened to abolish the new bureau—which now "contained a substantial portion of all the scientists in the Interior Department. Babbitt had put most of his eggs in one basket." In 1995, Babbitt renamed the NBS as the National Biological Service to allay opposition, but Congressional threat to the scientific organization persisted. In 1996, the National Biological Service was transferred to become the Biological Resources Division of the USGS. The BRD was renamed as the Biological Resources Discipline in 1999 as part of USGS Director Charles Groat's Strategic Change planning.

== General principles ==
The following are "general principles" the BRD states guide the implementation of its mission and form the basis of its strategic planning:

- BRD develops scientific and statistically reliable methods and protocols to assess the status and trends of the United States's biological resources.
- BRD utilizes tools from the biological, physical, and social sciences to understand the causes of biological and ecological trends and to predict the ecological consequences of management practices.
- BRD leads in the development and use of the technologies needed to synthesize, analyze, and disseminate biological and ecological information.
- BRD strives for quality, integrity, and credibility of its research and technology by constantly improving its scientific programs through internal quality control, external peer review, and competitive funding.
- BRD enters into partnerships with scientific collaborators to produce high-quality scientific information and partnerships with the users of scientific information to ensure this information's relevance and application to real problems.
- BRD provides reliable scientific information to all American citizens while recognizing a special obligation to serve the biological information needs of Department of the Interior bureaus.
