= Architecture of Norway =

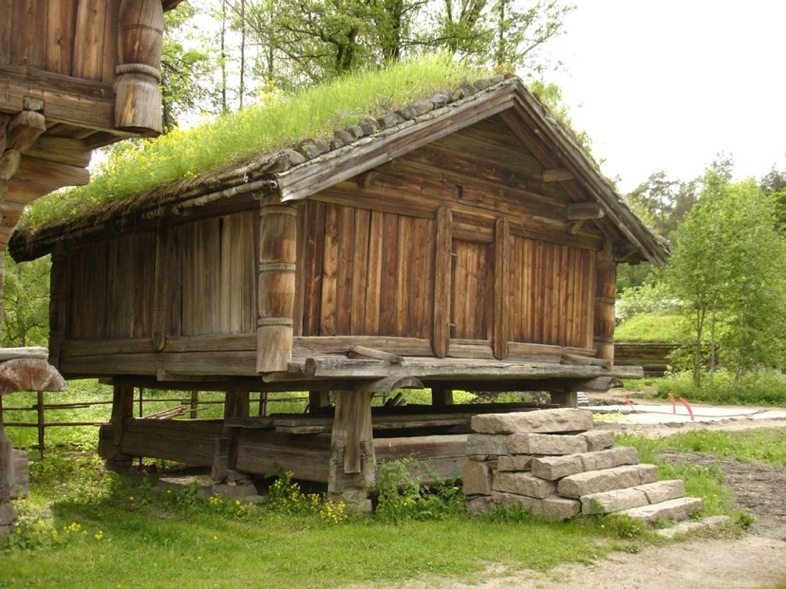
Storage house at the Norwegian Museum of Cultural History, from about 1800

The architecture of Norway has evolved in response to changing economic conditions, technological advances, demographic fluctuations and cultural shifts. While outside architectural influences are apparent in much of Norwegian architecture, they have often been adapted to meet Norwegian climatic conditions, including: harsh winters, high winds and, in coastal areas, salt spray.

Norway's architectural trends are also seen to parallel political and societal changes in Norway over the centuries. Prior to the Viking Age, wooden structures developed into a sophisticated craft evident in the elegant and effective construction of the Viking longships. Following that, the ascent of Christianity introduced Romanesque architecture in cathedrals and churches, with characteristically slightly pointed arches, barrel vaults, cruciform piers supporting vaults, and groin vaults; in large part as a result of religious influence from England.

During the Middle Ages, the geography dictated a dispersed economy and population. As a result, the traditional Norwegian farm culture remained strong, and Norway differed from most European countries in never adopting feudalism. This, combined with the ready availability of wood as a building material, ensured that relatively few examples of the Baroque, Renaissance, and Rococo architecture styles so often built by the ruling classes elsewhere in Europe, were constructed in Norway.

Instead, these factors resulted in distinctive traditions in Norwegian vernacular architecture, which have been preserved in existing farms in the multiple Norwegian open-air museums that showcase buildings from the Middle Ages through to the 19th century; prominent examples include the Norwegian Museum of Cultural History in Oslo and Maihaugen in Lillehammer, as well as extant buildings still in service on farms such as those in the Heidal valley.

In the 20th century, Norwegian architecture has been characterized by its connection with Norwegian social policy on the one hand, and innovation on the other. Norwegian architects have been recognized for their work, both within Norway—where architecture has been considered an expression of social policy—and outside Norway, in several innovative projects.

== General features ==
Construction in Norway has always been characterized by the need to shelter people, animals, and property from harsh weather, including predictably cold winters and frost, heavy precipitation in certain areas, wind and storms; and to make the most of scarce building resources. Until modern times, transportation infrastructure was also primitive, and builders largely had to rely on locally available materials.

== History ==
=== Prehistoric times ===
Thanks to new digging methods like topsoil excavation, archeologists have been able to further uncover the remains or foundations of 400 prehistoric houses that were previously hidden beneath the ground. Prior to this only 200 sites were immediately visible from the surface layer. Throughout the 20th century, Scandinavian archeologists have also been attempting to reconstruct prehistoric houses. The largest reconstruction project in Norway is the Bronze Age settlement at Forsand in Ryfylke and the Iron Age farm at Ullandhaug close by Stavanger. There's also the rebuild of the large chieftain house from the Viking age at Borg in Lofoten.

Most of our archeological material derives from surveys done in the 20th century, and excavations done in major cities the past 25 years [as of 2003], including other archeological surveys from the 80s and 90s.

The oldest surviving traces of construction in Norway dates back to about 9000 BC, in mountainous regions near Store Myrvatn in contemporary Rogaland, where excavations have found portable dwellings most likely kept by nomadic reindeer hunters. Traces of similar albeit younger tents have also been found other places along the western coast: Kollsnes in Øygarden Municipality in Vestland county; at Slettnes, Mortensnes (near Nesseby), and Sørøy in Finnmark county; and one dating back to around 6500 BC at Fosenstraumen near Radøy in Vestland. Stone age hunters must have used such simple tent and turf hut constructions, which in principle could have been similar to those still in use by Sámi nomads, with straight or hook-formed rods. The oldest turf hut had an approximately circle shaped floor plan and was built with two sets of hook latches (rafters that intersect at the roof ridge) which forms roof and walls as one element. For materials they probably used hides and wooden poles.

With time, such tents became semi-permanent through the introduction of a simple foundation, allowing people to stay in one place for longer parts of the year. These "houses" have a diameter of 3–6 meters (9.8–19.7 ft) and covers an area of 20 square meters (220 sq ft), and were found as oval pits that had been cleared for stones. In the centre of the building, there could well have been a fireplace, and a part of the floor could have been covered by a platform on which they could sleep on top of. They were also partly dug into the earth with external ramparts made of earth and stone. Traces of these constructions can be found along the whole coast, but especially in the north: Leksa and Flatanger in Trøndelag and Mortensnes in Finnmark. The most notable of these is located in the Vegaøyan archipelago, an area that is now a UNESCO World Heritage Site.

There have been a number of instances where several houses have been found together in a cluster. This suggests that multiple family groups that's been living together in the same place. On Vega, such houses were already in use by 7000 BC, and they were still in use 5000 years later, in the transition from the Stone age into the Bronze Age around 1800 BC. At this point, the houses became larger and they gained a rectangular form, covering an area of 70 square meters (750 sq ft), as demonstrated at Gressbakken in Nesseby Municipality in Finnmark. Excavations have revealed that the inner walls were protected by thick ramparts of stone and peat, and there is evidence of several entrances through this rampart-wall. The roof construction of these buildings is uncertain, however. It is difficult to conclude whether the rafts rested on the ramparts or on top of posts. Since it is not uncommon to find several fireplaces along the mid axis of the house, it is deduced that multiple families stayed collectively at these larger houses.

The first permanent dwellings were probably built between 3000 and 2000 BC, with the introduction of agriculture to Norway. Available evidence indicates that wood was the most used building material for these structures. Iron Age dwellings typically combined shelter for animals and humans in long houses in order to preserve heat. Remains of structures from the Stone Age through the Bronze Age and the Iron Age have been excavated at Forsand in Ryfylke, near Stavanger and several other locations. Most prehistoric longhouses had pairs of roof-bearing posts dividing the interior into three naves, and walls of palisades, wattle and daub or turf. Similar buildings have been excavated all over Northwestern Europe.

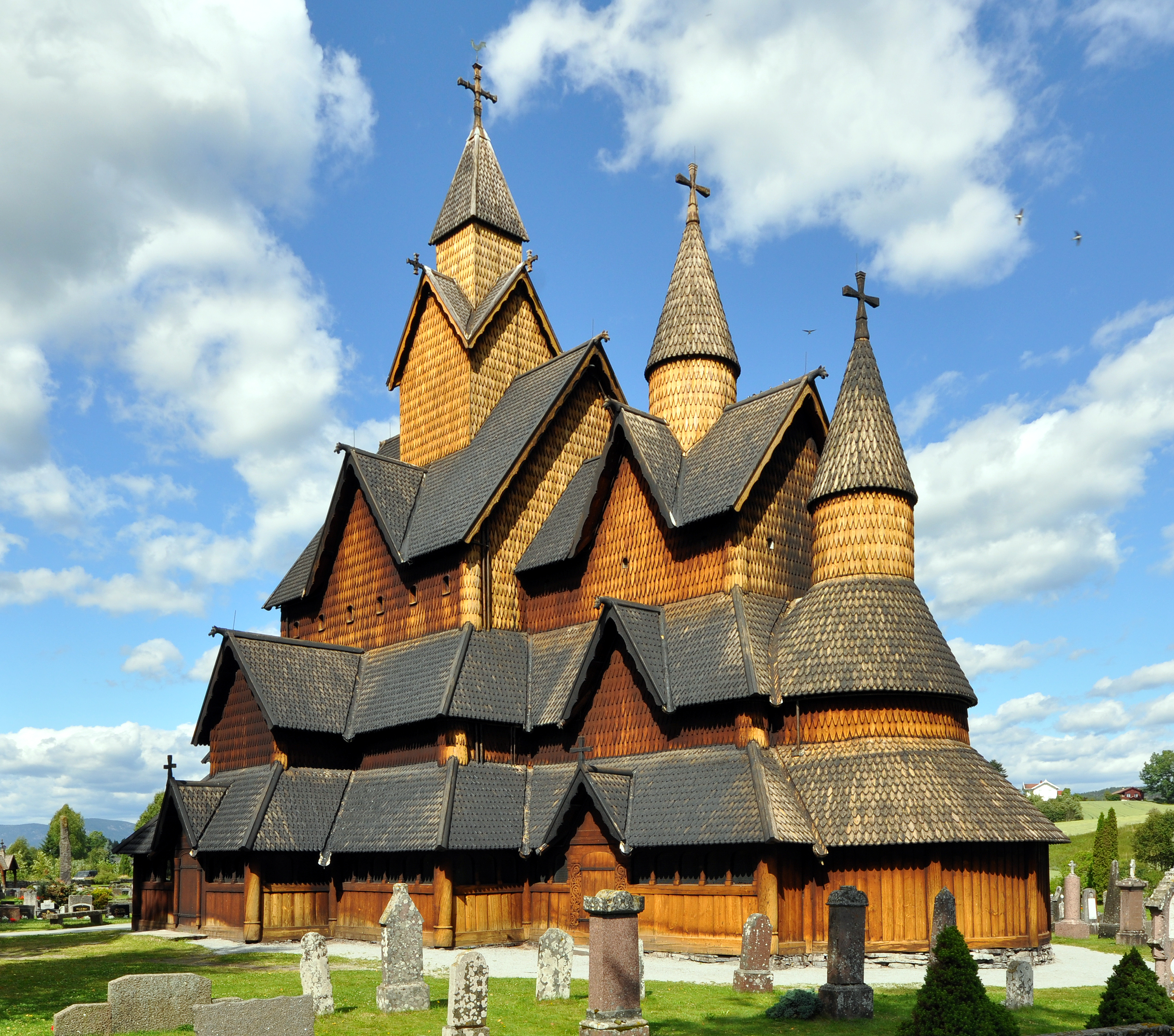
Heddal Stave Church in Notodden Municipality, the largest stave church in Norway

=== Viking and medieval eras ===
Two distinctive timber building traditions found their confluence in Norwegian architecture. One was the practice of log building with horizontal logs notched at the corners, a technique thought to have been imported from the peoples to the east of Scandinavia. The other was the stave building tradition (typically found in stave churches), possibly based on improvements on the prehistoric longhouses that had roof-bearing posts dug into the ground. Although there is scant archaeological evidence of actual buildings from the earliest permanent structures, finds of Viking ships (e.g., the Oseberg ship) suggest significant mastery of woodworking and engineering. In the Lofoten archipelago in Northern Norway, a Viking chieftain's holding has been reconstructed at the Lofotr Viking Museum.

Not counting the 28 remaining stave churches, at least 250 wooden houses predating the Black Death in 1350 are preserved more or less intact in Norway. Most of these are log houses, some with added stave-built galleries or porches.

As the political power in Norway was consolidated and had to contend with external threats, larger structures were built in accordance with military technology at the time. Fortresses, bridges, and ultimately churches and manors were built with stone and masonry. These structures followed the European styles of their time.

==== Stave churches ====
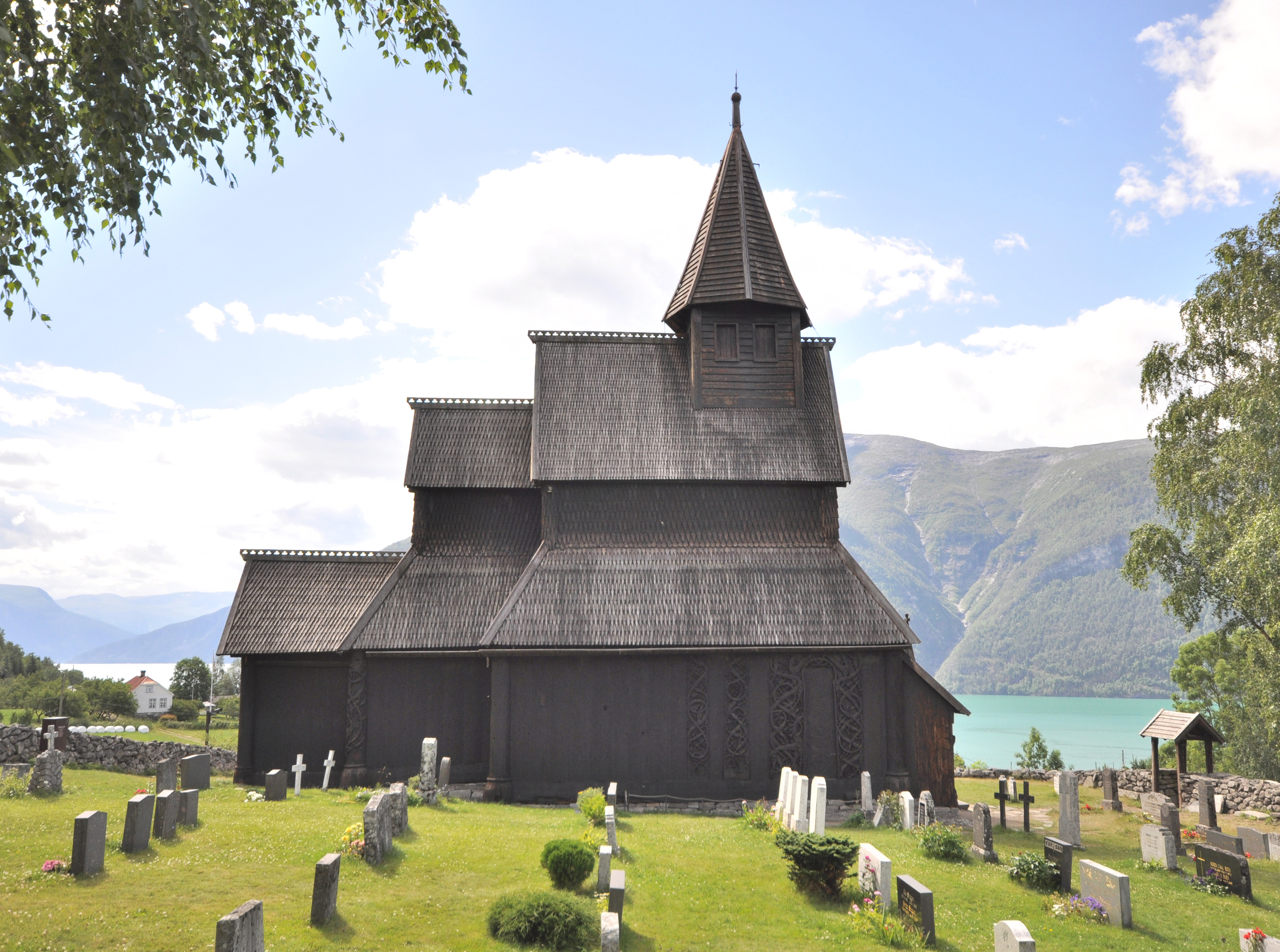
Urnes stave church in Luster Municipality is listed as a world Heritage Site by UNESCO.

Possibly more than 1000 stave churches were built in Norway during the Middle Ages, most of them during the 12th and 13th centuries. Until the beginning of the 19th century, as many as 150 stave churches still existed. A number of them were destroyed as part of a religious movement that favored simple, puritan lines, and today only 28 remain, though a large number were documented and recorded by measured drawings before they were demolished.

The stave churches owe their longevity to architectural innovations that protected these large, complex wooden structures against water rot, precipitation, wind, and extreme temperatures. Most important was the introduction of massive sills underneath the staves (posts) to prevent them from rotting. Over the two centuries of stave church construction, this building type evolved to an advanced art and science. After the Reformation, however, no new stave churches were built. New churches were mainly of stone or horizontal log buildings with notched corners. Most old stave churches disappeared because of redundancy, neglect or deterioration, or because they were too small to accommodate larger congregations, and too impractical according to later standards.

=== Romanesque architecture ===
The first stone churches in Norway were Romanesque, built under the influence of Anglo-Saxon missionaries, particularly bishop Nicholas Breakspear. Later churches were influenced by Continental architecture. Examples include Ringsaker Church and the Old Kviteseid Church. A number of these churches have either been lost or rebuilt in the Gothic style, but numerous examples still exist, notably the Trondenes Church in Harstad Municipality in Troms county.

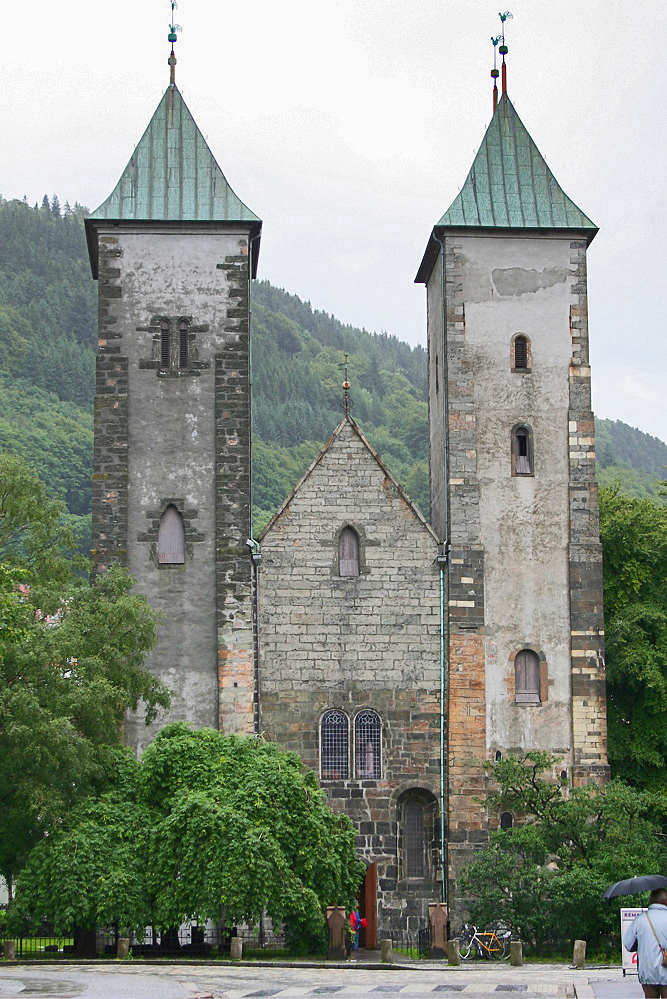
St Mary's Church, Bergen Municipality

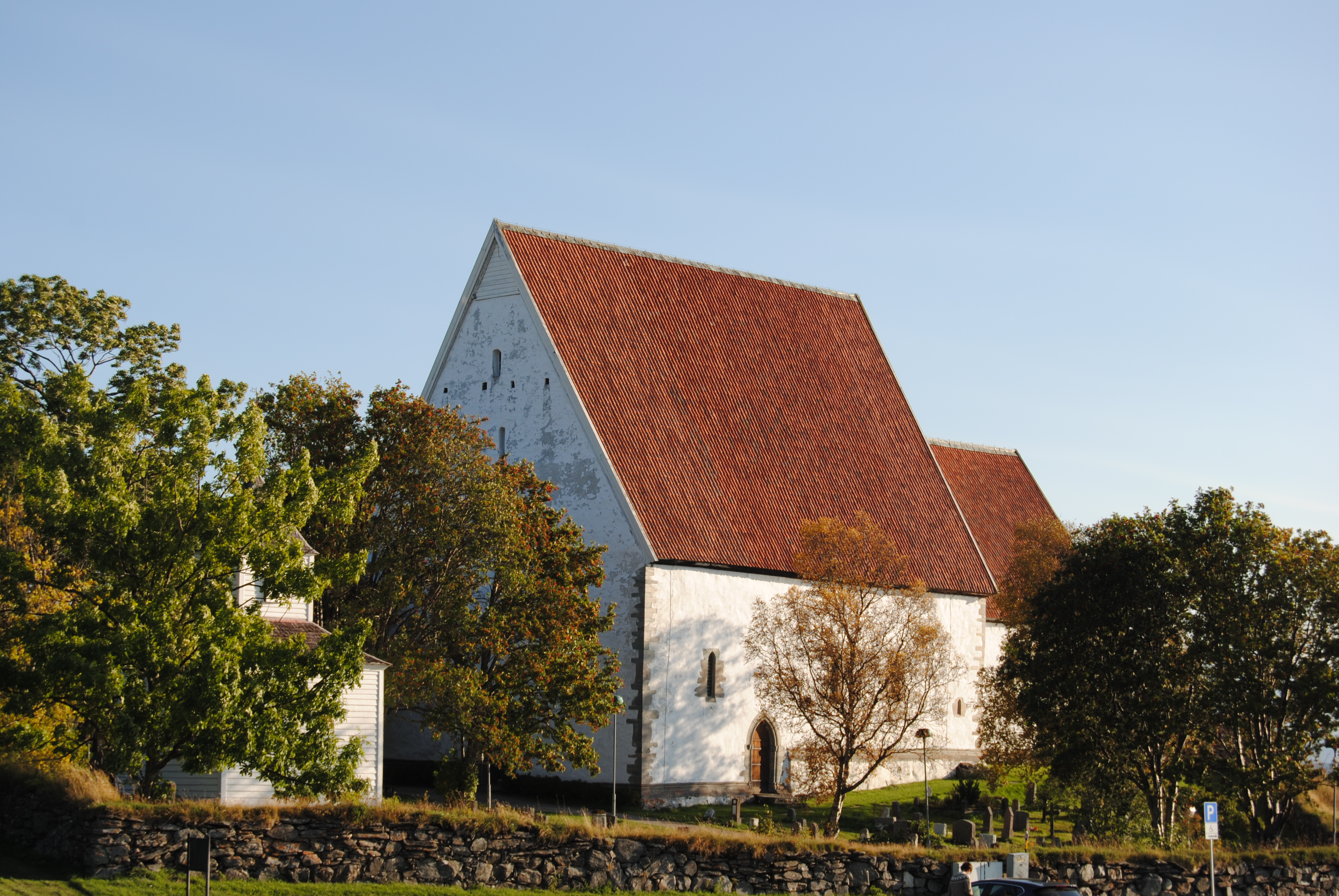
Trondenes Church, Harstad Municipality

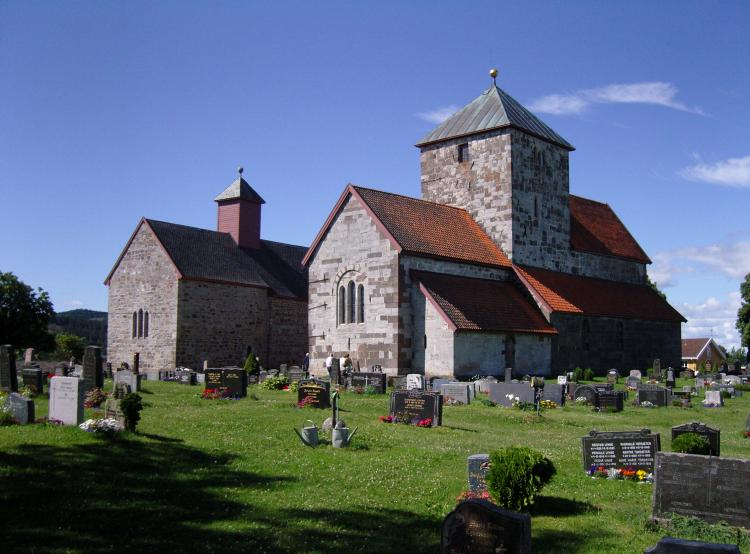
Sister Churches, Gran Municipality (c. 1150)

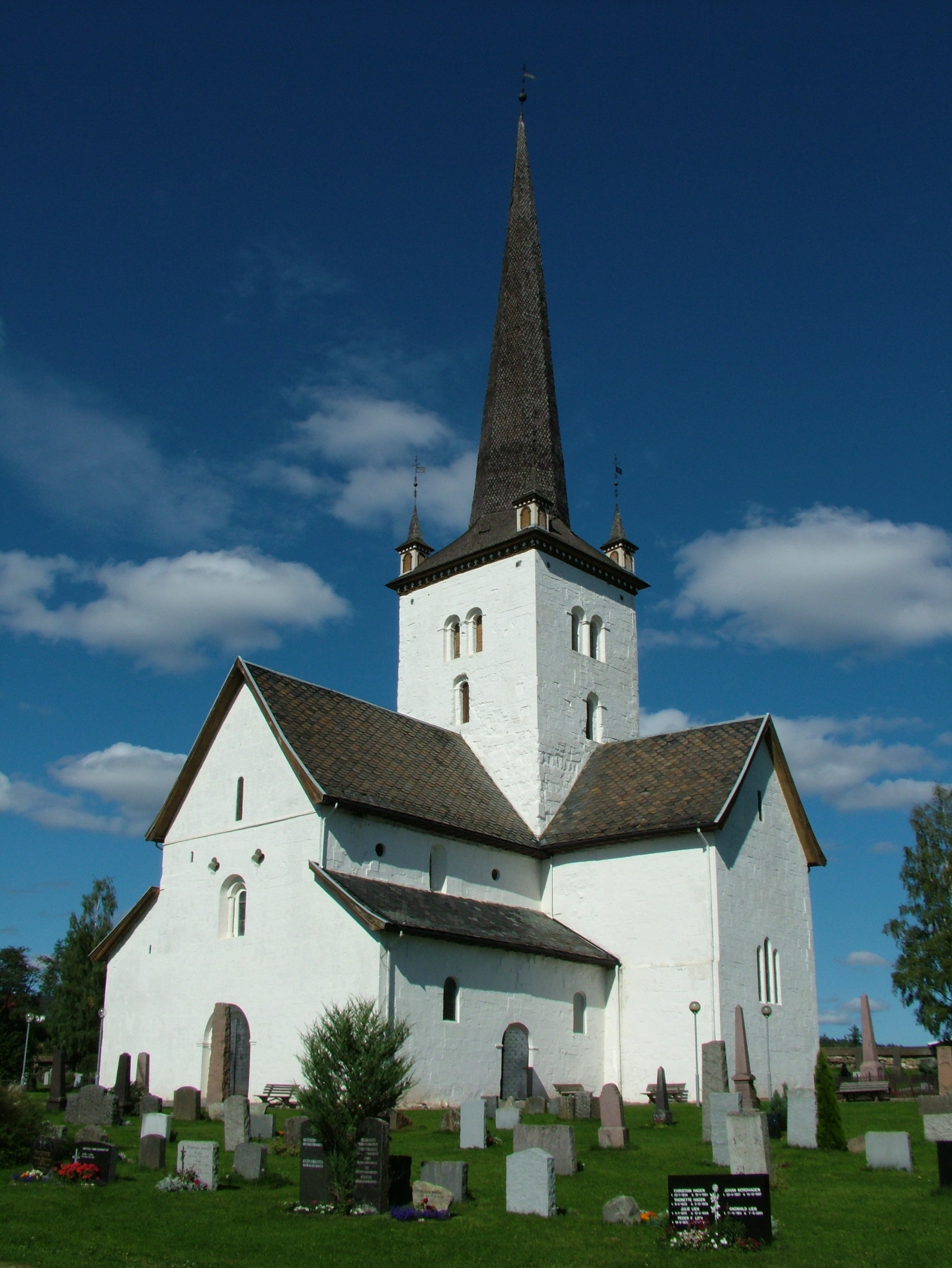
Ringsaker Church, Moelv (c. 1150)

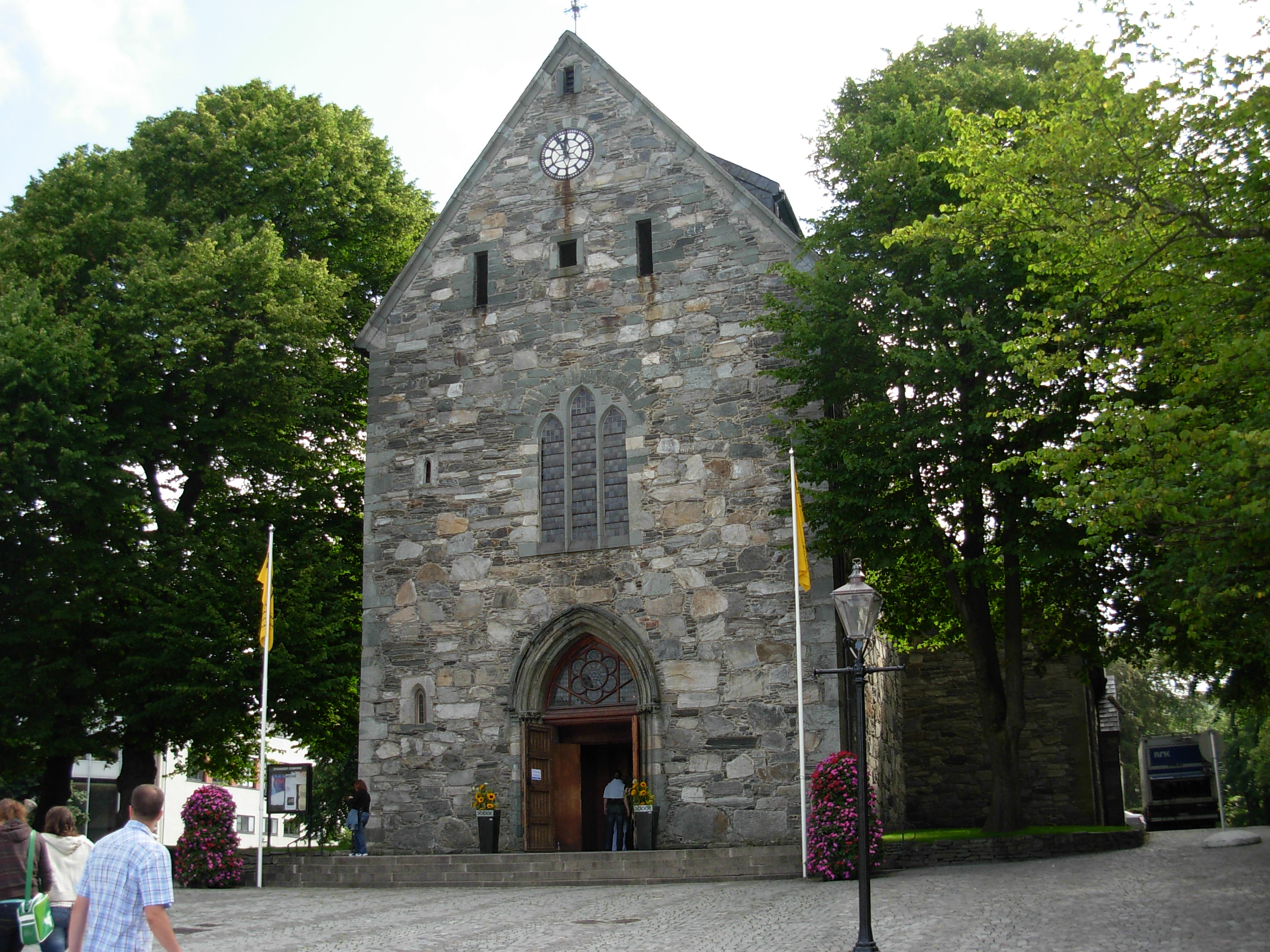
Western façade of Stavanger Cathedral

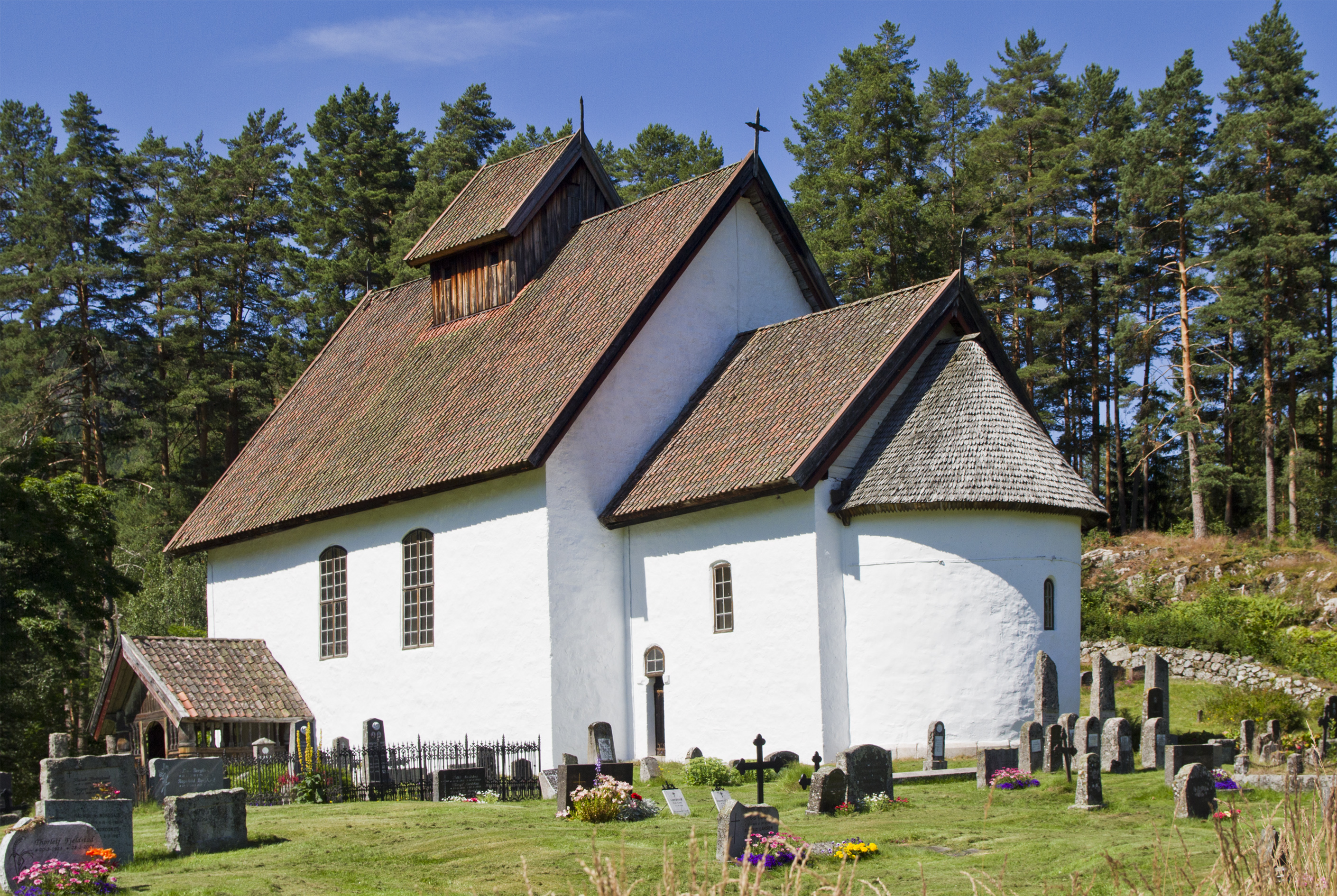
Old Kviteseid Church (c. 1260)

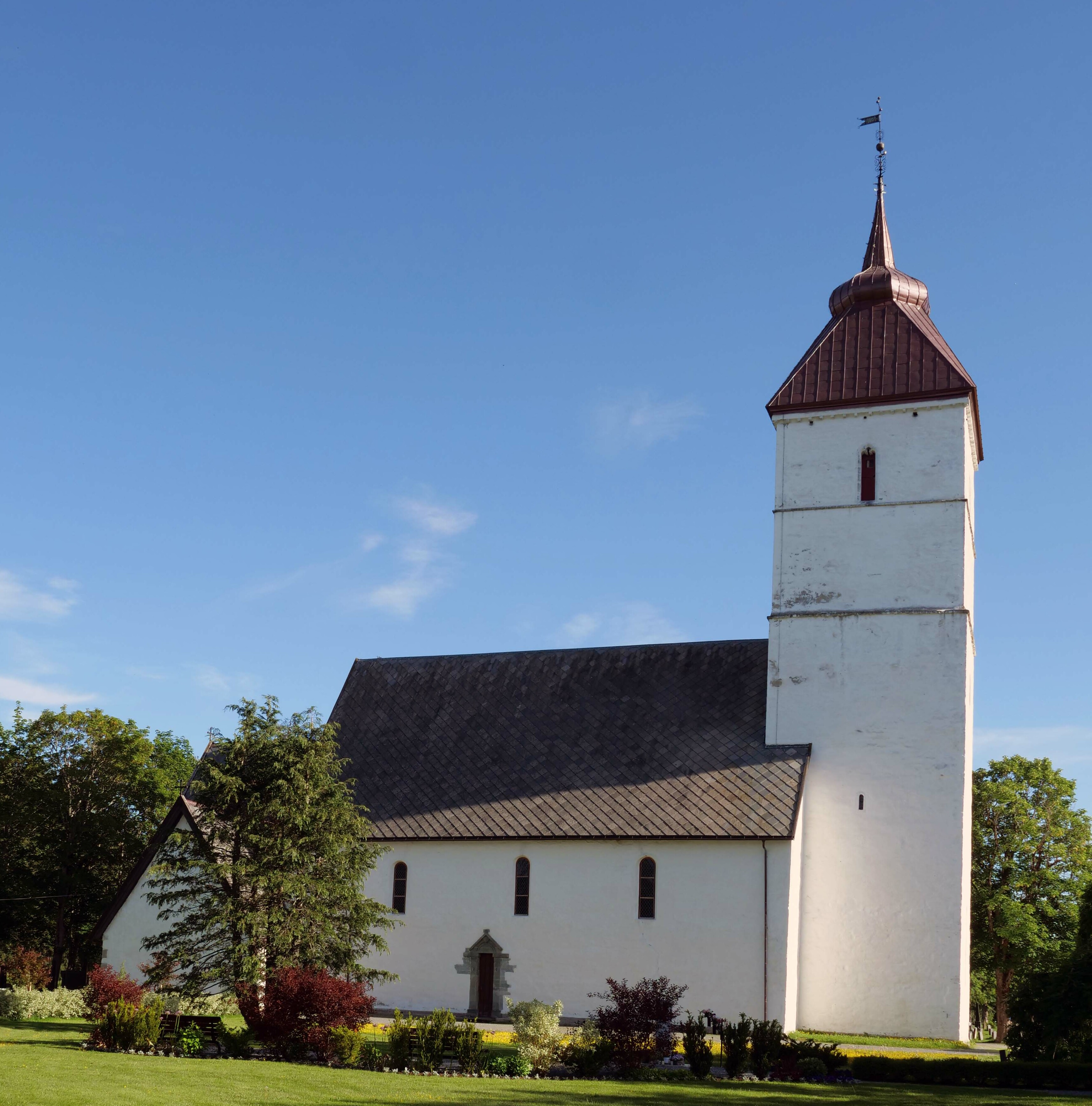
Værnes Church, Stjørdal Municipality

=== Gothic architecture ===
Several churches that were originally built as Romanesque structures were modified or extended during the Gothic period. Among these are the Old Hamar Cathedral (now in ruins), the Stavanger Cathedral, and the renowned Nidaros Cathedral, one of the most important pilgrim destinations in medieval Europe.

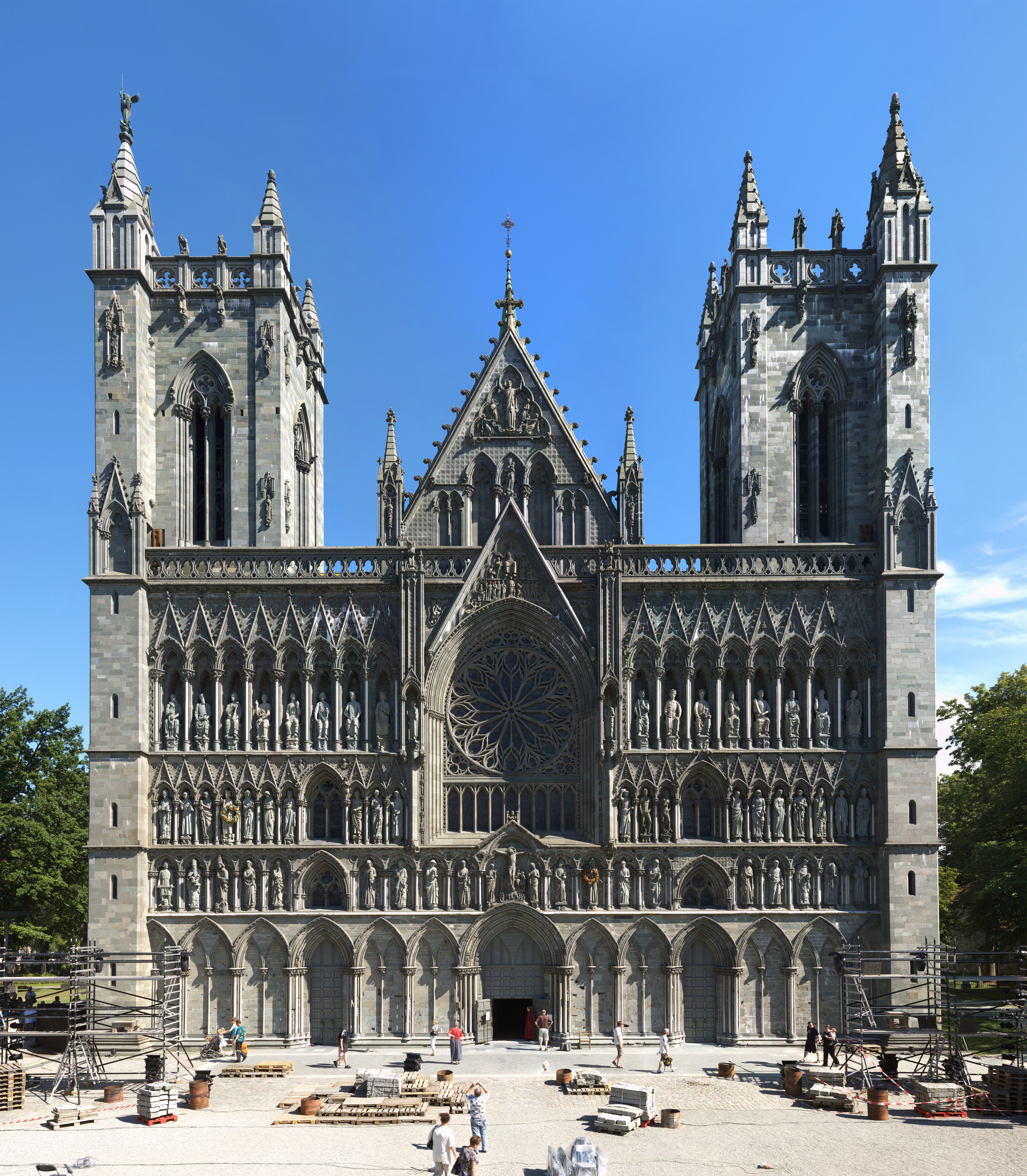
Nidaros Cathedral, Trondheim (city) (1183–1248)

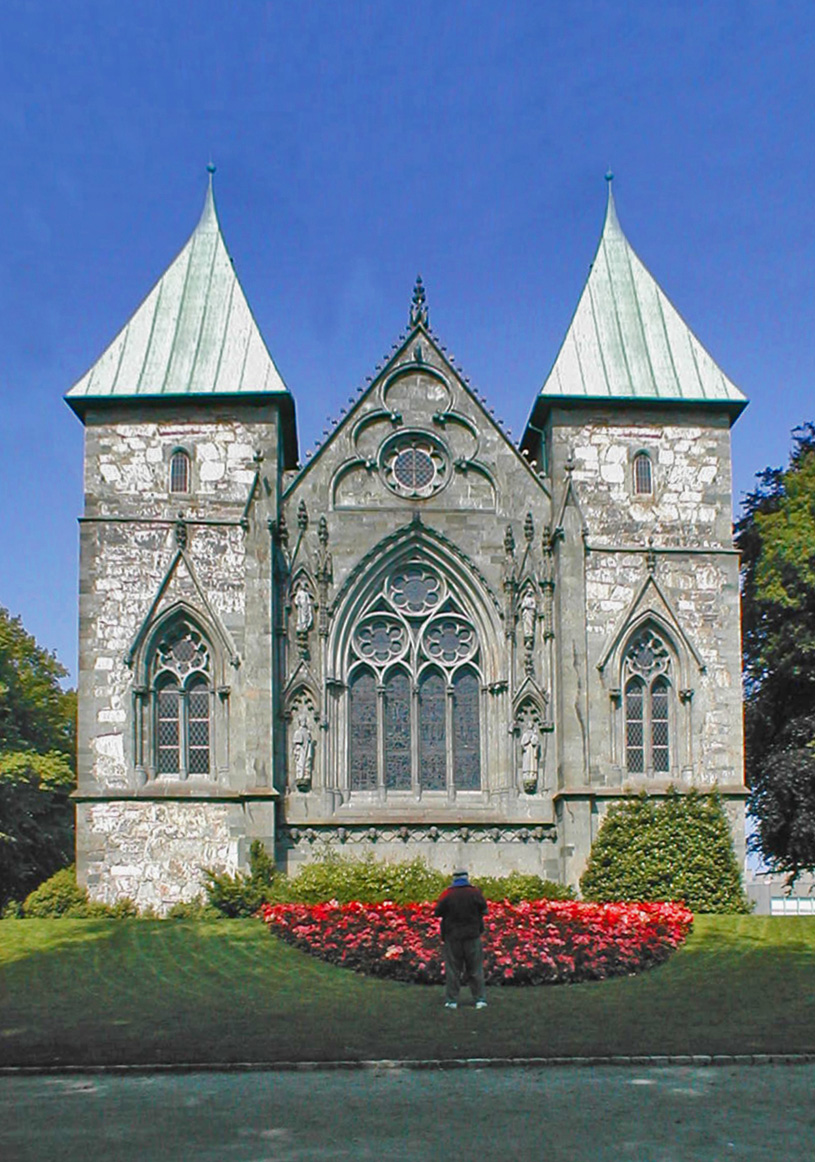
Eastern façade of Stavanger Cathedral

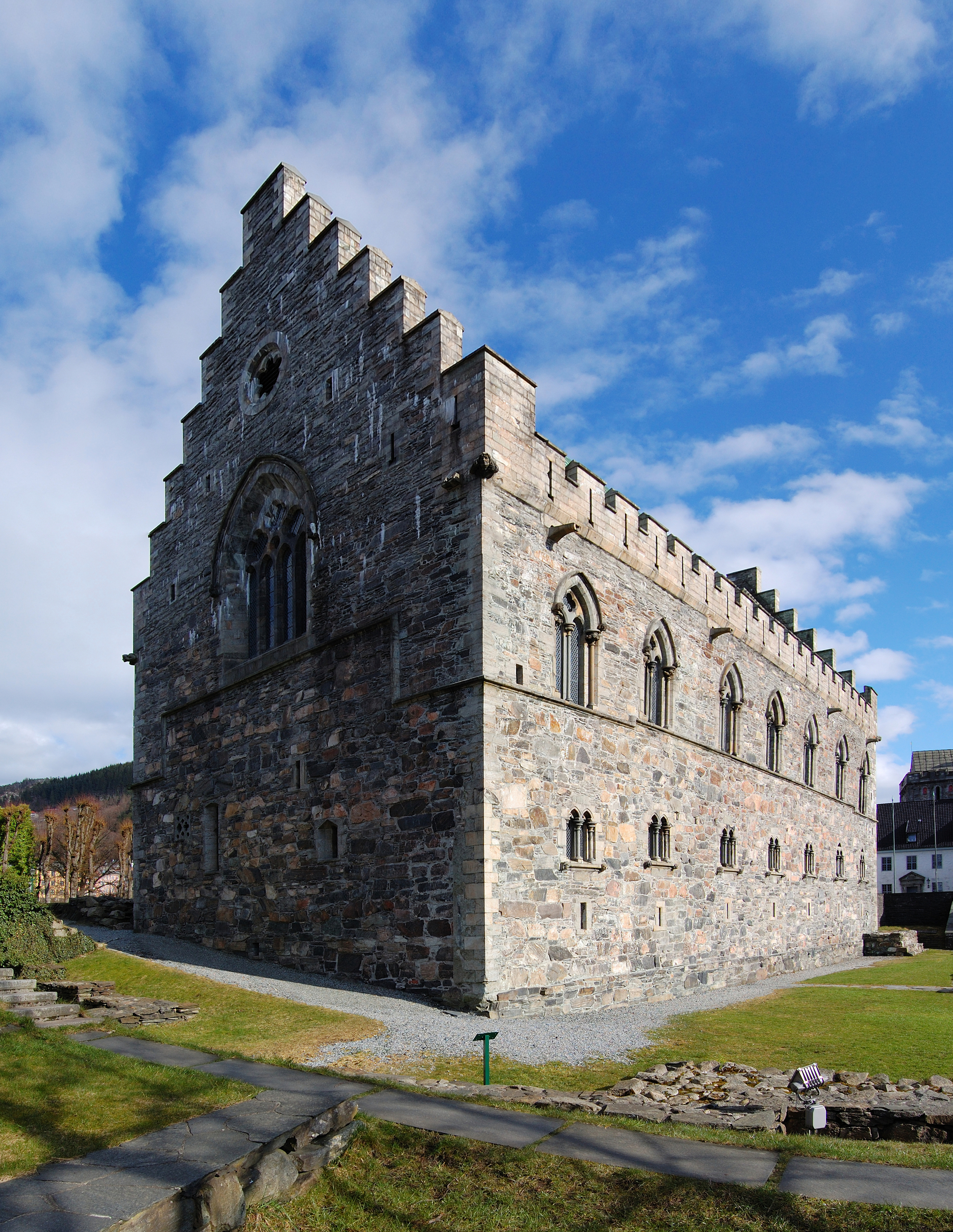
Haakonshallen in Bergen (c. 1261)

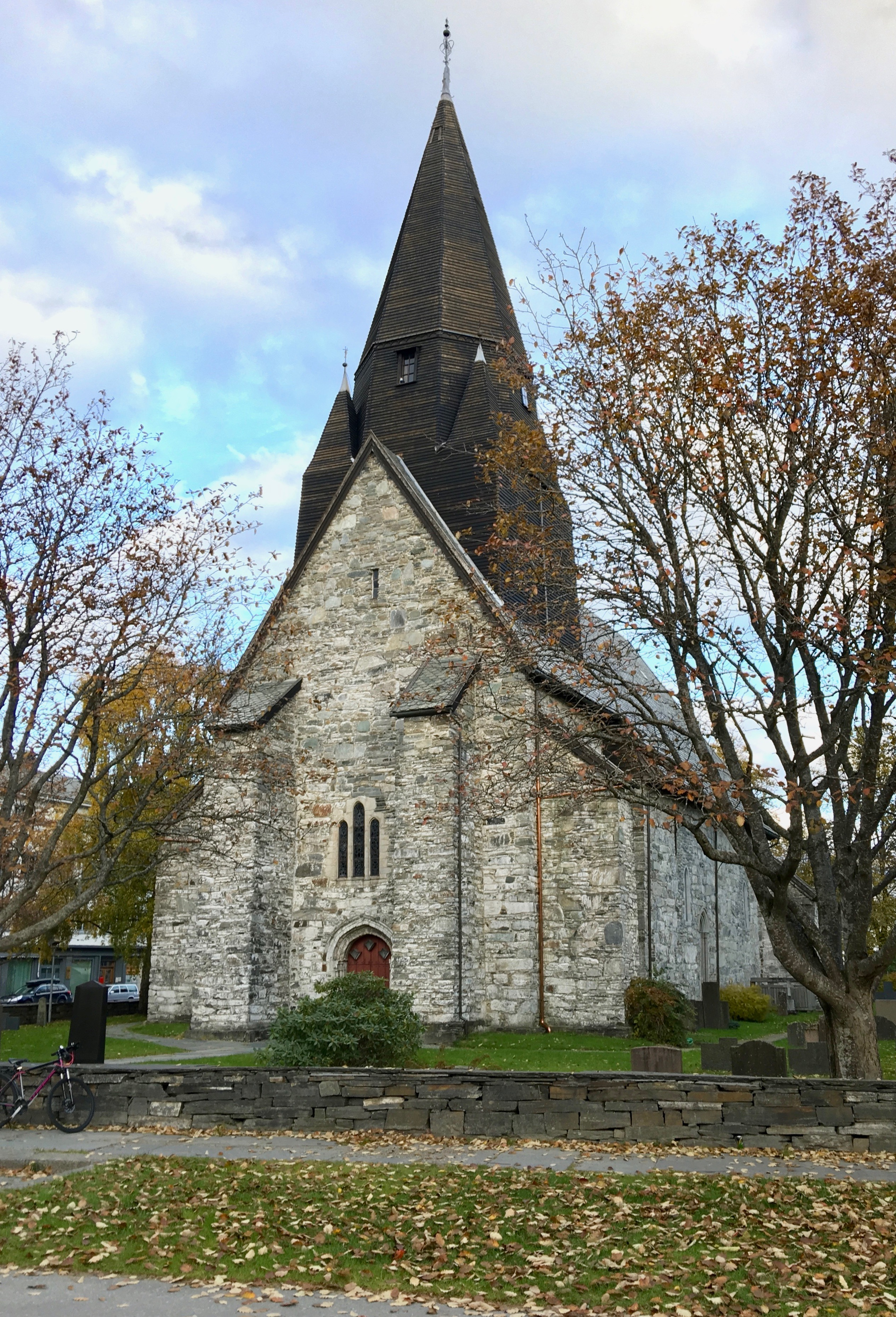
Voss Church (c. 1277)

=== Under Danish rule ===
In the late Middle Ages, the Norwegian state was severely weakened. In 1389 Norway entered into a personal union with Denmark and Sweden in the Kalmar Union. As the kings resided in Denmark, Norway was gradually reduced to a provincial status, and after the Reformation most of its separate institutions were abolished. The Danish government in Copenhagen regarded Norway as a backward province to be exploited, but not worthy of investment in monumental architecture. Hence, ambitious Renaissance architecture is unusual in Norway compared to other European countries.

Fortresses, such as Akershus in Oslo, Vardøhus in Vardø, Tønsberghus in Tønsberg, the Kongsgården in Trondheim and Bergenhus with the Rosenkrantz Tower in Bergen were built in stone in accordance with standards for defensive fortifications of their time. A number of these were modernized and rebuilt through the years.

The Hanseatic League also built unique commercial buildings at Bryggen in Bergen, starting in the 16th century. They were log buildings combining native and German traditions.

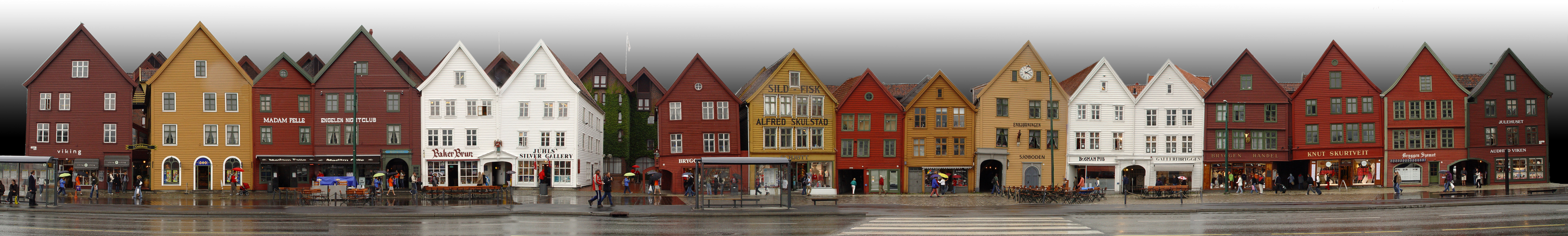
Panoramic view of Bryggen. The eleven houses to the right were rebuilt after a fire in 1702. The six houses to the left were rebuilt after a fire in 1955.

==== Renaissance architecture ====
After the Black Death, monumental construction in Norway came to a standstill, except for vernacular building, only to be resumed in the 16th and 17th centuries under Danish administration. There are few examples of Renaissance architecture in Norway, the most prominent being the Rosenkrantz Tower in Bergen, Barony Rosendal in Hardanger, and the contemporary Austråt manor near Trondheim, and parts of Akershus Fortress.

Christian IV undertook a number of projects in Norway that were largely based on Renaissance architecture He established mining operations in Kongsberg and Røros, now a World Heritage Site. After a devastating fire in 1624, the town of Oslo was moved to a new location and rebuilt as a fortified city with an orthogonal layout surrounded by ramparts, and renamed Christiania. King Christian also founded the trading city of Kristiansand, naming it after himself.

==== Baroque architecture ====
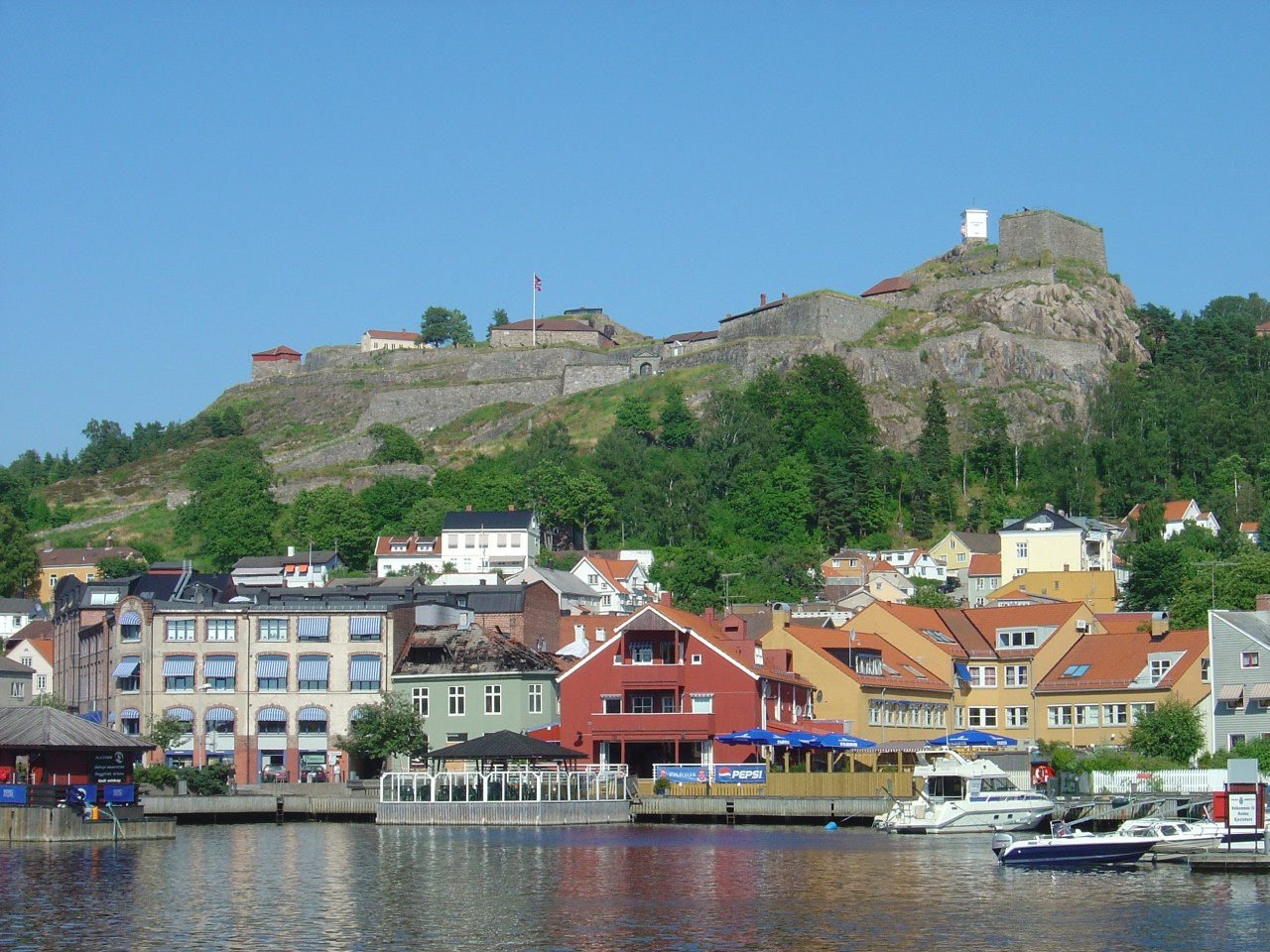
Fredrikshald / Fredriksten, a border town built to protect the Dano-Norwegian realm

As Norway became a strategic part of the Danish-Norwegian kingdom, Danish kings built fortifications along borders and the seacoast. Over time, a number of the fortifications at border areas and ports were modernized in line with Baroque military practice.

Although most residences were built according to local vernacular traditions, some manors (such as Austrått and Rosendal) exhibit the influence of Baroque architecture. Only the city of Christiania (Oslo) had a building code that prohibited wooden houses, and a number of large town houses modeled after Continental building types were constructed. Some large churches were constructed with brick walls, notably in Bergen, Christiania, Røros, and Kongsberg.

Probably the most famous Baroque structure in Norway is Stiftsgården, the Royal residence in Trondheim, a residential building that is one of the largest wooden structure in Northern Europe.

==== Rococo architecture ====
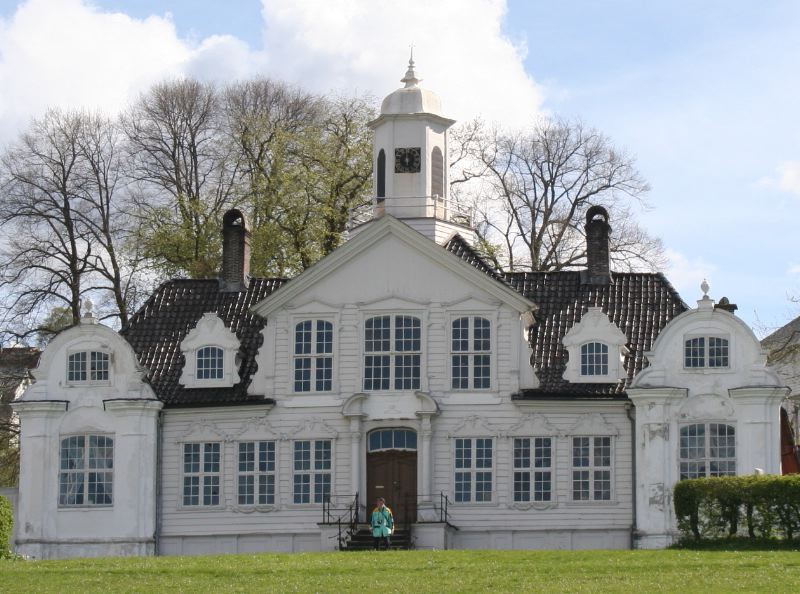
Damsgård Manor in Bergen is an example of Norwegian rococo architecture.

Rococo provided a brief but significant interlude in Norway, appearing primarily in the decorative arts, and mainly in interiors, furniture and luxury articles such as table silver, glass and stoneware. In some country districts, folk artists produced the distinctly Norwegian craft of decorative painting, rosemaling, and related wood carving style. In polite architecture, a few wooden town houses and manors show rococo influence, notably in Trondheim and Bergen, Damsgård Manor in Bergen being the most significant.

In towns and central country districts during the 18th century, log walls were increasingly covered by weatherboards, a fashion made possible by sawmill technology. These buildings were better insulated and better protected against the harsh climate. But the main reason for the rapid adoption of this custom was the more fashionable appearance of boarded walls, which were more suitable than bare log walls as a background to details and ornaments borrowed from classical architecture.

=== 19th century ===
The Napoleonic Wars led to the separation of Norway and Denmark. Norway was restored in 1814 as an autonomous kingdom in a personal union with Sweden. The two states had separate institutions, except for the king and the foreign service. Regained statehood required new public buildings, mainly in the capital of Christiania. During the following century, the country experienced impressive growth in wealth and population, resulting in a need for new infrastructure and buildings.

==== Neo-classicism ====
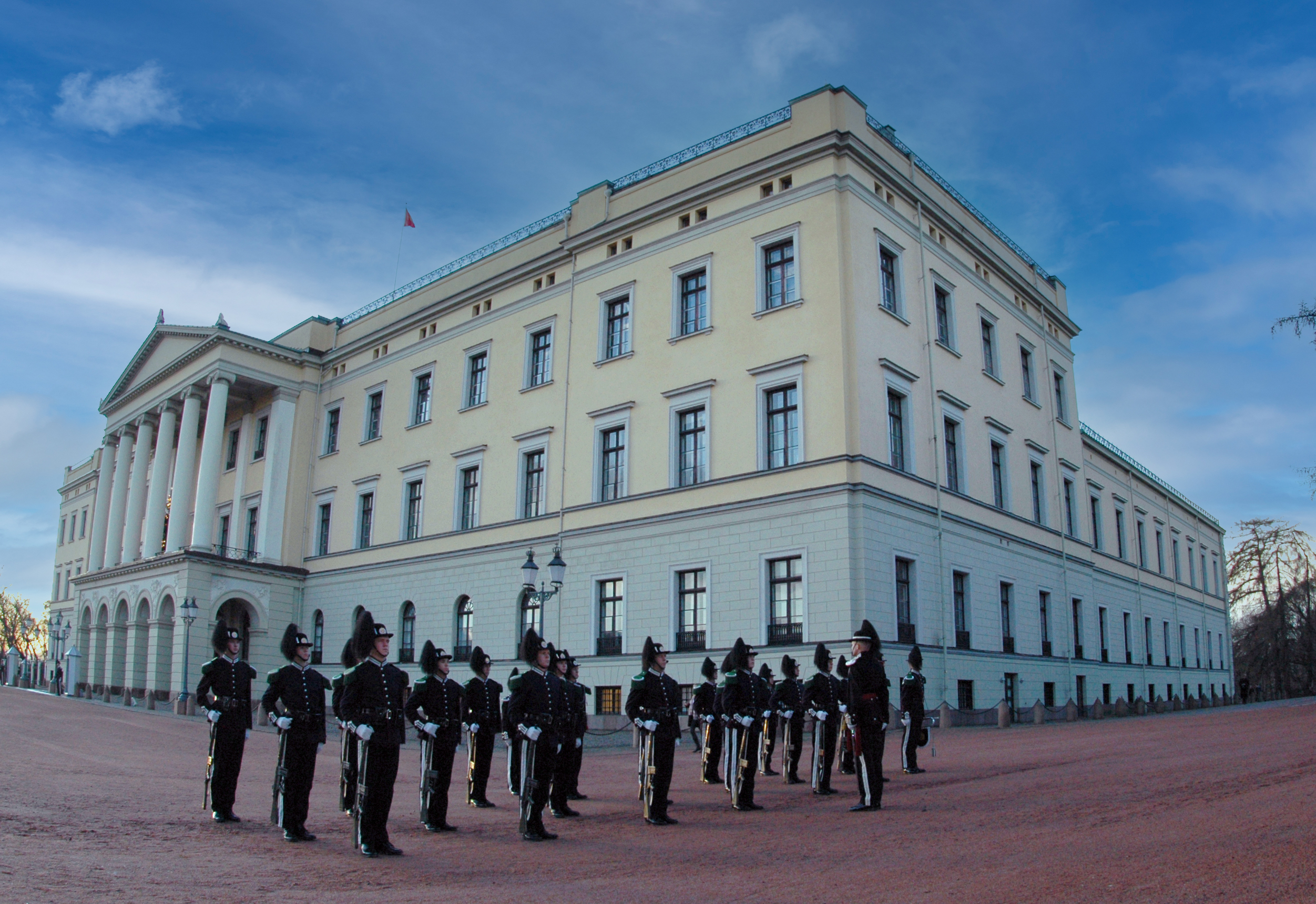
The Royal Palace at Oslo, an example of neo-Classical architecture in Norway

At the dawn of the 19th century, less than a handful of academically trained architects were active in Norway, most of them military officers having studied civil engineering. The market for architects was limited in a sparsely inhabited country with no capital city, no court and no important government institutions. Architecture was of interest mainly to a limited group of wealthy merchants and landowners. However, toward the close of the previous century, this group saw a remarkable increase in prosperity. Large fortunes were made by a few, who then sought to surround themselves with buildings and gardens appropriate to their social position. Well connected internationally, these people were acquainted with the latest trends in architecture. Neoclassical structures were much in demand.

Architect Carl Frederik Stanley (1769–1805), educated in Copenhagen, spent some years in Norway around the turn of the 19th century. He did minor works for wealthy patrons in and around Oslo, but his major achievement was the renovation of the only seat of higher education in Christiania, the Oslo Katedralskole, completed in 1800. He added a classical portico to the front of an older structure, and a semi-circular auditorium that was sequestered by Parliament in 1814 as a temporary place to assemble, now preserved at Norwegian Museum of Cultural History as a national monument.

Christian Collett (1771–1833), a graduate of the Mining Academy at Kongsberg, designed the splendid Ulefoss manor, built between 1802 and 1807 by sawmill owner Niels Aall. This is one of the few brick houses in Norway, boasting a palladian layout, a central cupola, and a classical colonnade. Collett designed several other manors and town houses.

The same period saw the erection of a large number of splendid neo-classicist houses in and around all towns along the coast, notably in Halden, Oslo, Drammen, Arendal, Bergen and Trondheim, mainly wooden buildings dressed up as stone architecture. By far the largest private house in Norway is the Jarlsberg Manor, renovated 1812–14 by the Danish architect Løser for count Herman Wedel-Jarlsberg.

Christiania, promoted to the status of a capital city in 1814, had practically no buildings suitable for the new government institutions. An ambitious building program was initiated, but realised slowly because of a strained economy. The first major undertaking was the Royal Palace, designed by Hans Linstow and built between 1824 and 1848. Linstow also planned Karl Johans gate, the avenue connecting the Palace and the city, with a monumental square halfway to be surrounded by buildings for the university, the Parliament (Storting) and other institutions. But only the university buildings were realised according to this plan. Christian Heinrich Grosch, one of the first fully educated architects in Norway, designed the original building for the Oslo Stock Exchange (1826–1828), the local branch of the Bank of Norway (1828), Christiania Theatre (1836–1837), and the first campus for the University of Oslo (1841–1856). For the university buildings, he sought the assistance of the renowned German architect Karl Friedrich Schinkel.

The German architectural influence persisted in Norway, and multiple wooden buildings followed the principles of Neoclassicism.

==== Romanticism and historicism ====
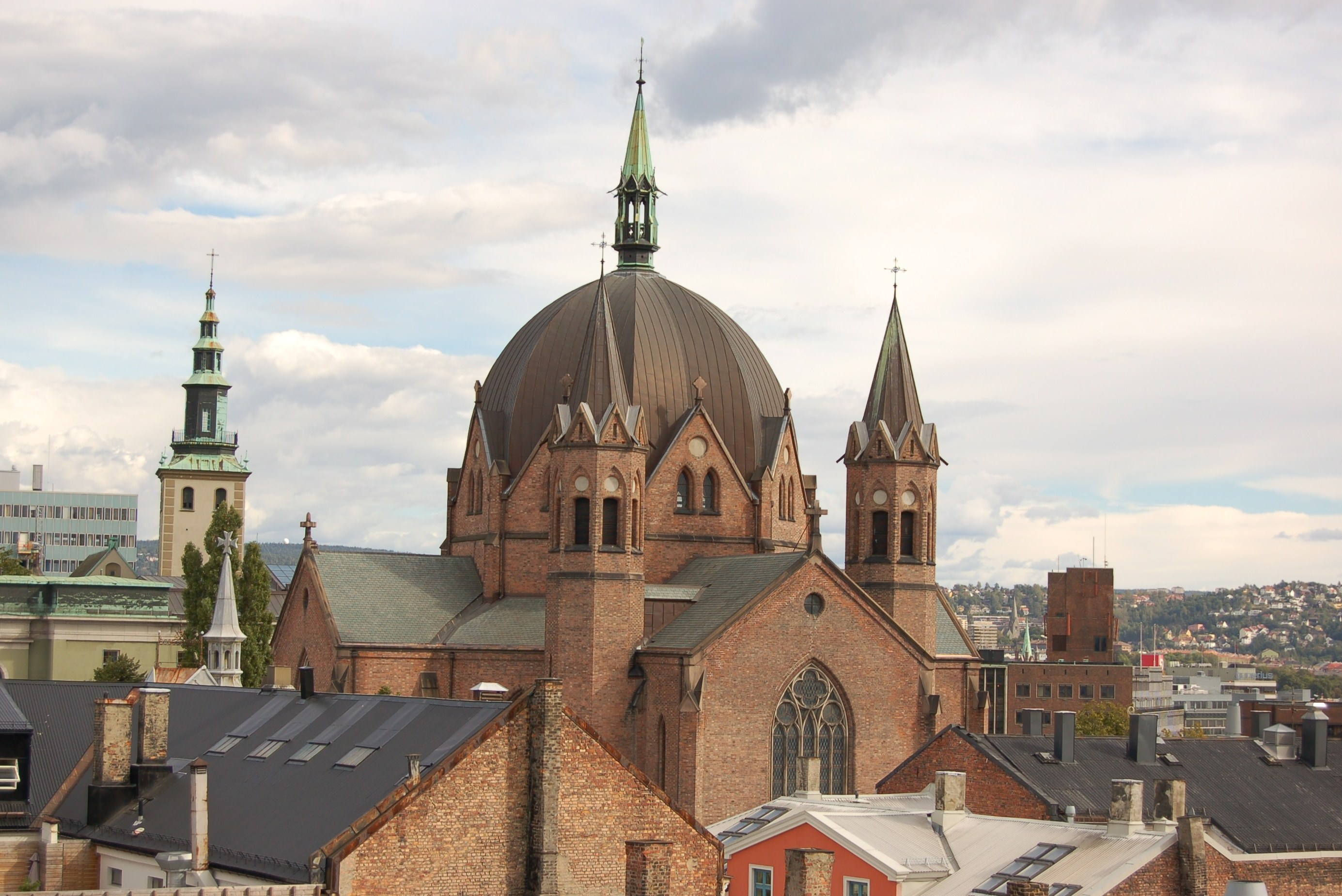
Trinity Church in Oslo

Norwegian romantic nationalism also had an influence on Norwegian architecture from around 1840. Following the German lead, multiple classicist architects designed red-brick buildings in a revival of medieval styles. Romanesque and Gothic examples were considered eminently suitable for churches, public institutions and factories. Linstow was the first Norwegian architect to be inspired by the Middle Ages in his proposal of 1837 for a square to be surrounded by public building, bisected by an avenue between Christiania and the new Royal Palace. On the north side, planned buildings for the university were to be "composed in some Medieval or Florentine style", with exposed brick-work. His classicist colleague Grosch was the first to convert to historicism and realize a number of red-brick buildings, after his 1838 visit to Berlin, where he met the famous architect Karl Friedrich Schinkel. The first major historicist work by Grosch was the neo-romanesque Bazaars and the adjacent fire station near the Oslo Cathedral, begun in 1840 and extended in several stages until 1859. Other architects followed, notably Heinrich Ernst Schirmer with the Botsfengselet (penitentiary) (1844–1851), the Gaustad Hospital (1844–1855) and the Railway Station (1854) (with von Hanno). Also in Oslo, the German architect Alexis de Chateauneuf (1799-1853) designed Trefoldighetskirken, the first neo-gothic church, completed by von Hanno in 1858.

Most urban apartment buildings and villas continued to be built in the classical tradition, with plastered brick walls. The repertoire of historic styles was expanded in Homansbyen, Oslo's first residential development of detached villas, planned by Georg Andreas Bull. He designed most of the early villas built from 1858 until 1862 in a variety of styles, ranging from medieval to classicist and exotic.

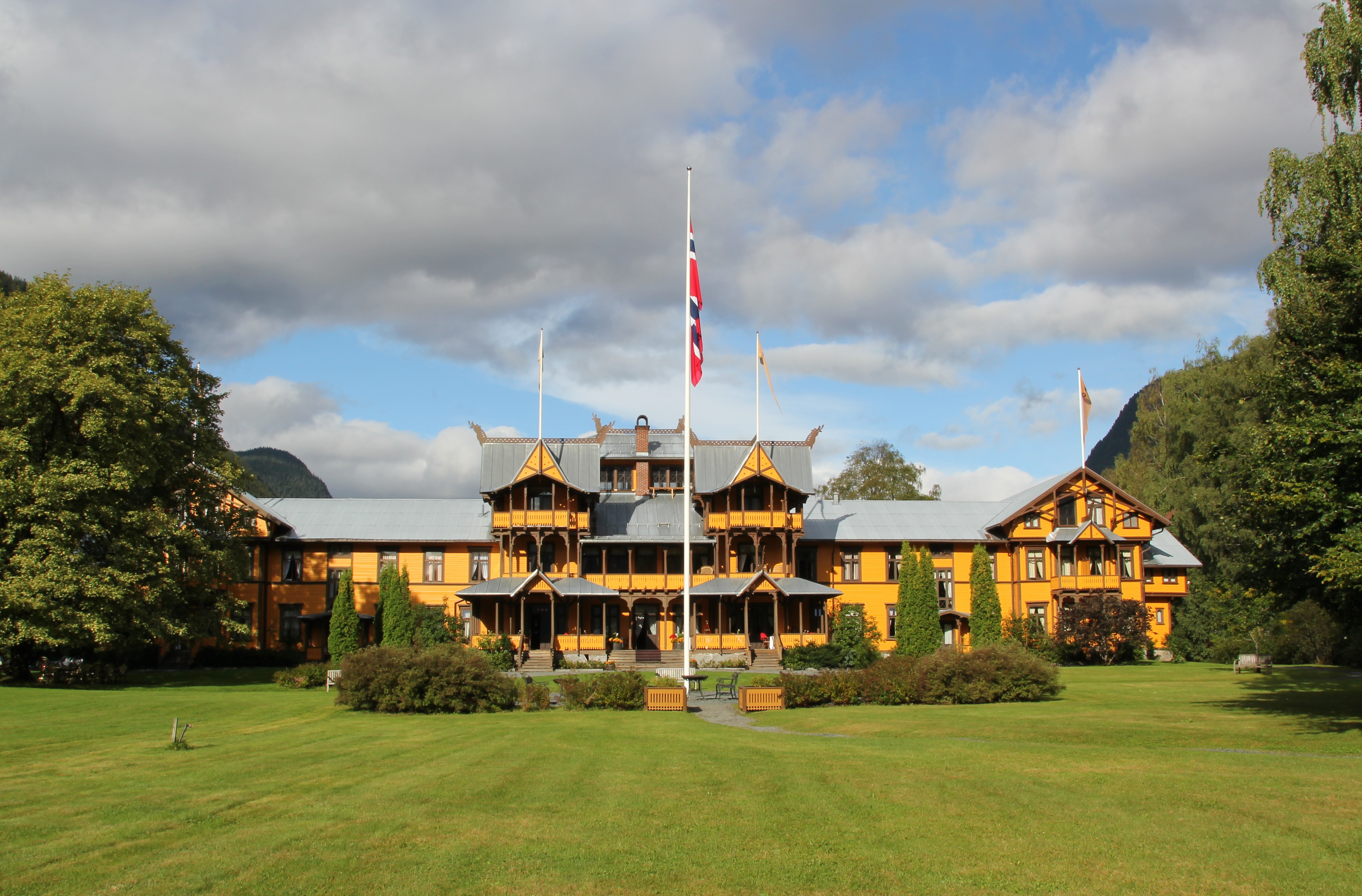
Dalen Hotel is a good example of the so-called "dragon style".

From around 1840, architects started to design wooden buildings in a new style, the so-called Swiss chalet style. The style and its name originated in Germany, where Swiss popular culture was much admired by the romanticists. Elements such as projecting roofs, verandas and emphasis on gables were inspired from Alpine vernacular buildings. But the style may more correctly be termed historicism in wood, a term introduced by Jens Christian Eldal. A number of residential, institutional, and commercial buildings were built in this style, characterized by ornate, projecting details. Railway stations and churches, designed by trained architects, were distributed all in rural districts and helped to make this style popular and to keep it alive in the vernacular tradition long after it went out of fashion among architects.

The Swiss chalet-style evolved into a Scandinavian variation, known in Norway as the "dragon style”, which combined motifs from Viking and medieval art with vernacular elements from the more recent past. The most renowned practitioner of this style was the architect Holm Hansen Munthe, who designed a number of tourist resorts, exhibition pavilions and churches in the 1880s and 1890s. These caught the eye of the German emperor Wilhelm II, who visited Norway annually. He commissioned Munthe to design his "Matrosenstation" near Potsdam and a hunting lodge with a "stave church" in Rominten in East Prussia. These last buildings were destroyed during World War II.

Architects abandoned both the "Swiss" and the "dragon" styles shortly after 1900, but elements of the "Swiss style" survived in vernacular buildings for some decades. In the recent past, producers of prefabricated family homes have increasingly reintroduced motifs from the "Swiss" style in their repertoire.

=== Vernacular architecture ===
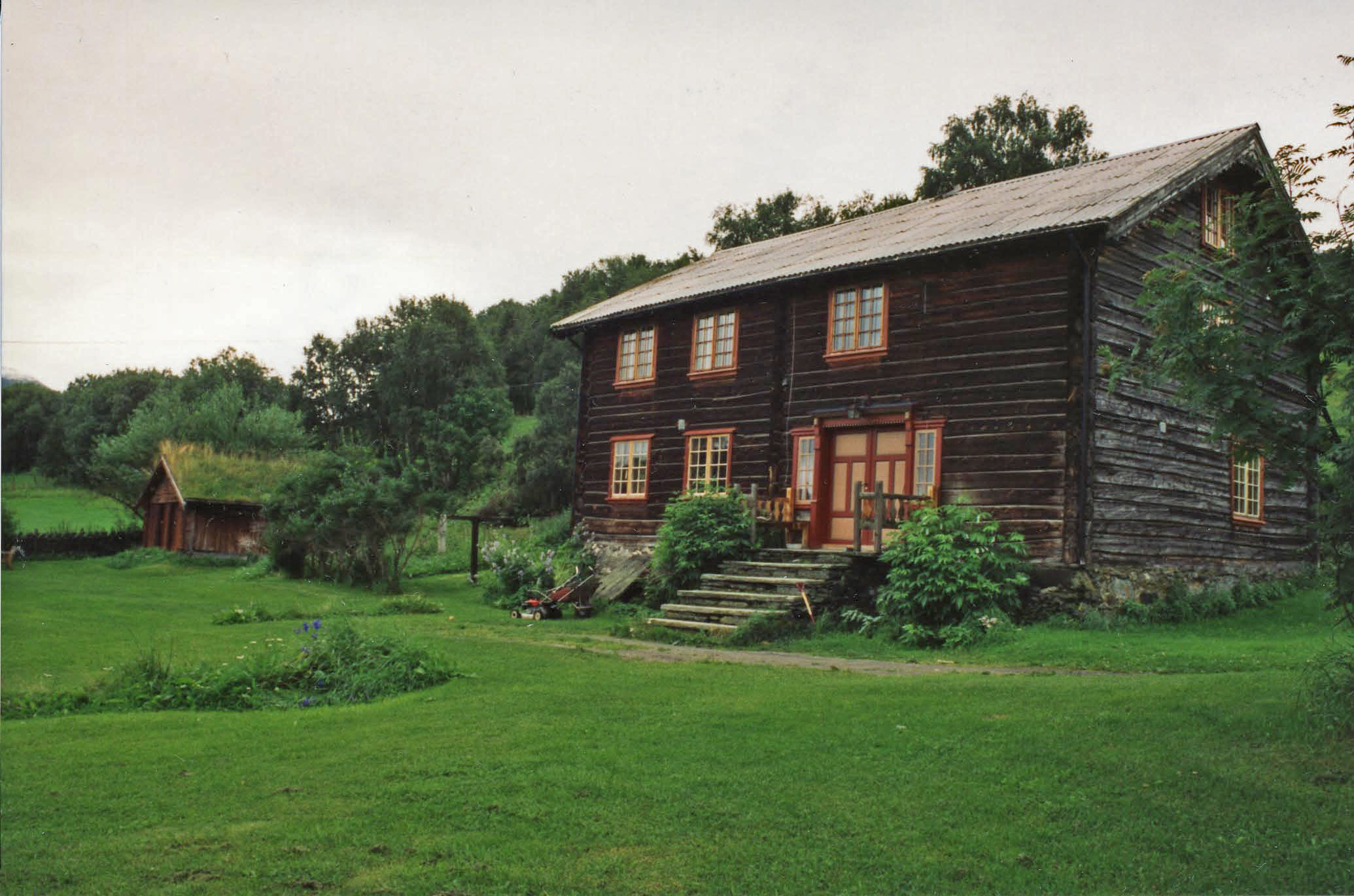
Trønderlåne, example of vernacular architecture typically found in Trøndelag

Until the 20th century, most Norwegians lived and worked in buildings that were designed and built according to vernacular building traditions (byggeskikk). These practices varied somewhat by region and climatic conditions and evolved over time, but were largely based on use of wood and other locally available resources.

Since the Middle Ages, most dwellings were log houses with notched corners, carefully crafted to ensure protection against the elements. Centrally placed open-hearth fires with smoke vents in the roofs gave way to stone stoves and chimneys in early modern times. Specialized buildings became commonplace, organized around farmyards (gårdstun). The introduction of exterior boarding (weatherboarding) in the 18th century improved housing standards considerably and gave rise to larger houses.

Building practices along the coast also included boathouses, fishing cottages, piers, etc. Here, houses for livestock and people were typically built up from the actual shoreline. A typical medium-sized farm in the inland of Norway would include a dwelling house (våningshus), hay barn (låve), livestock barn (fjøs), one or more food storage houses (stabbur), a stable, and occasionally separate houses for poultry, pigs, etc. Houses that had separate heat sources, e.g., washing houses (eldhus) and smithies were usually kept separate from the other houses to prevent fires. Outhouses were typically separate, small structures. If the farm housed craftsmen, there would also be separate houses for carpentry, wheel making, shoemaking, etc.

In Eastern inland Norway and Trøndelag, the houses around a tun were typically organized in a square (firkanttun); in Gudbrandsdal, there was a distinction between inntun (inner tun) and uttun (outer tun). The configuration of houses also depended on whether the farm was situated on a hill or in flatter terrain.

Depending upon the size and economic well-being of the farm, there might also be a feast hall (oppstue), a house for the retired farmers (føderådstue), farm hands' dormitory (drengstue), carriage house (vognskjul), and even distillery (brenneskur). Smaller, poorer farms might combine barns and dwelling houses, have simpler storage areas, and use the facilities of other farms for activities they could not afford to build houses for.

Building traditions varied by region and type of structure. Food storage houses – stabbur – were usually built on stilts in ways that made it difficult for mice and rats, but not cats, to get in. Exterior cladding varied by region, often to take into account local climate conditions. Roofs were often covered with birch bark and sod.

Many places in Norway farms also maintained mountain farms (seter/støl), where cows, goats, and sheep would put out to pasture during the summer months. These would typically include a small dwelling house and a dairy for making and storing cheese, sour cream, etc.

Modern Norwegian farms often maintain multiple building traditions but no longer need the varied buildings of the past. However, a number of the traditions have been carried on in more recently built vacation cabins in the mountains and along the coast.

=== 20th-century architecture ===
The German influence brought into Norway by neo-classicism abated when Norway gained full independence in 1905. A new generation of Norwegian architects educated in Sweden took the lead in developing a distinctly national architecture, endeavouring to break the German historicist tradition. However, German modernism and town planning continued to influence early 20th-century architecture. As the Norwegian Institute of Technology was founded in 1910 and began to teach architecture in Trondheim, there also emerged a distinctly Norwegian collegium of architects that has contributed to a Norwegian regional architecture, discussed by the art historian Sigfried Giedeon.

==== Art Nouveau architecture 1900–1920 ====
The Jugendstil, a German variant of Art Nouveau, had a certain influence on much of the new construction in Norway around the turn of the 20th century. There was also a local Nordic variation, National Romantic style, with clear medieval inspirations, like the Norwegian University of Science and Technology main campus in Trondheim. After the Ålesund Fire in 1904, the city of Ålesund was rebuilt almost entirely in Jugendstil and continues to be a prominent example, along with Riga and Brussels. Trondheim also has numerous art nouveau buildings. In the capital Oslo, few art nouveau buildings were erected, due to a local economic crisis and a stagnant building trade during the first decade of the century. However, some public buildings were constructed in this style, such as the Historical Museum and the Government office building. In Bergen, the main theatre Den Nationale Scene is a monumental example.

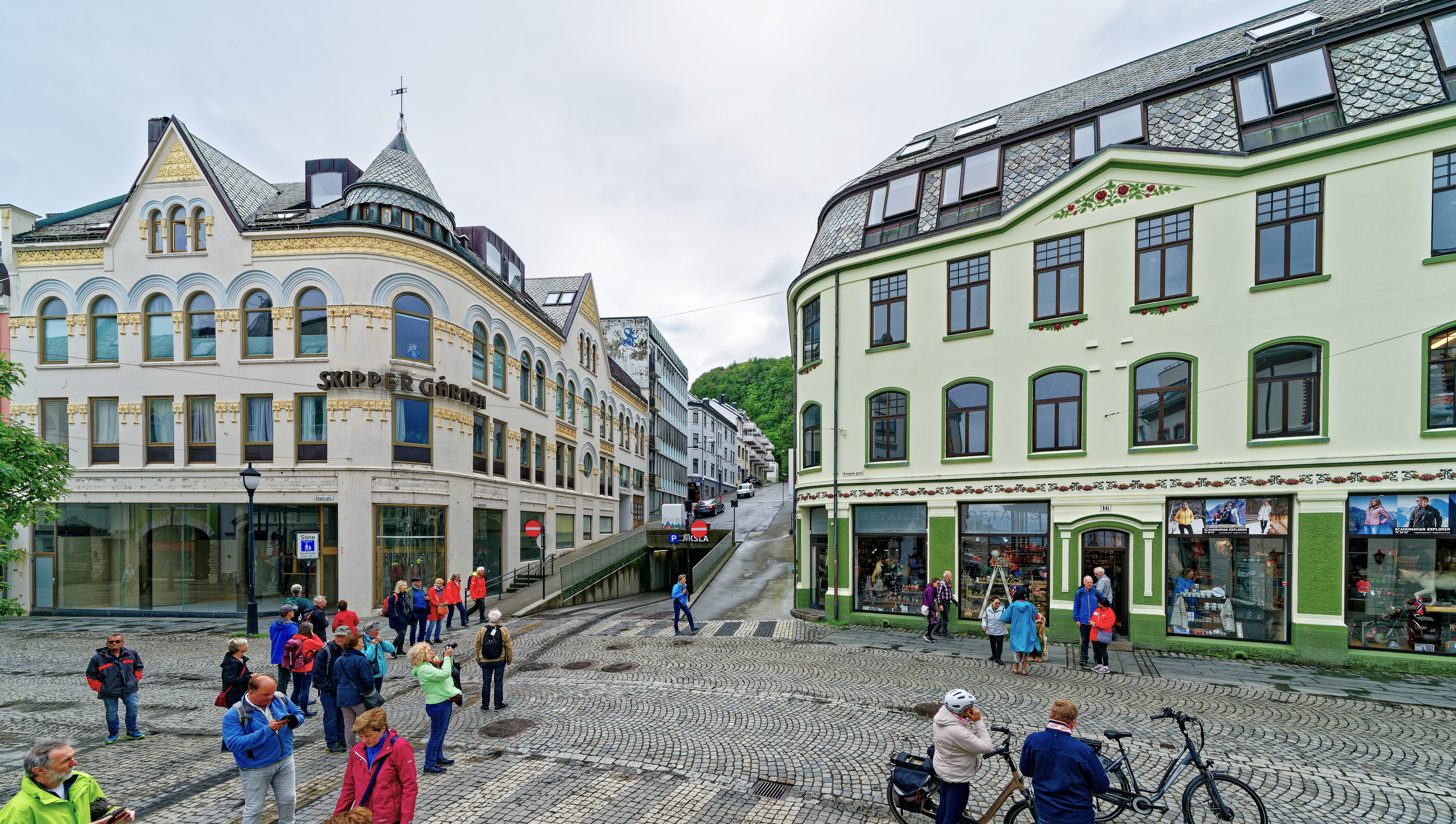
Ålesund city centre

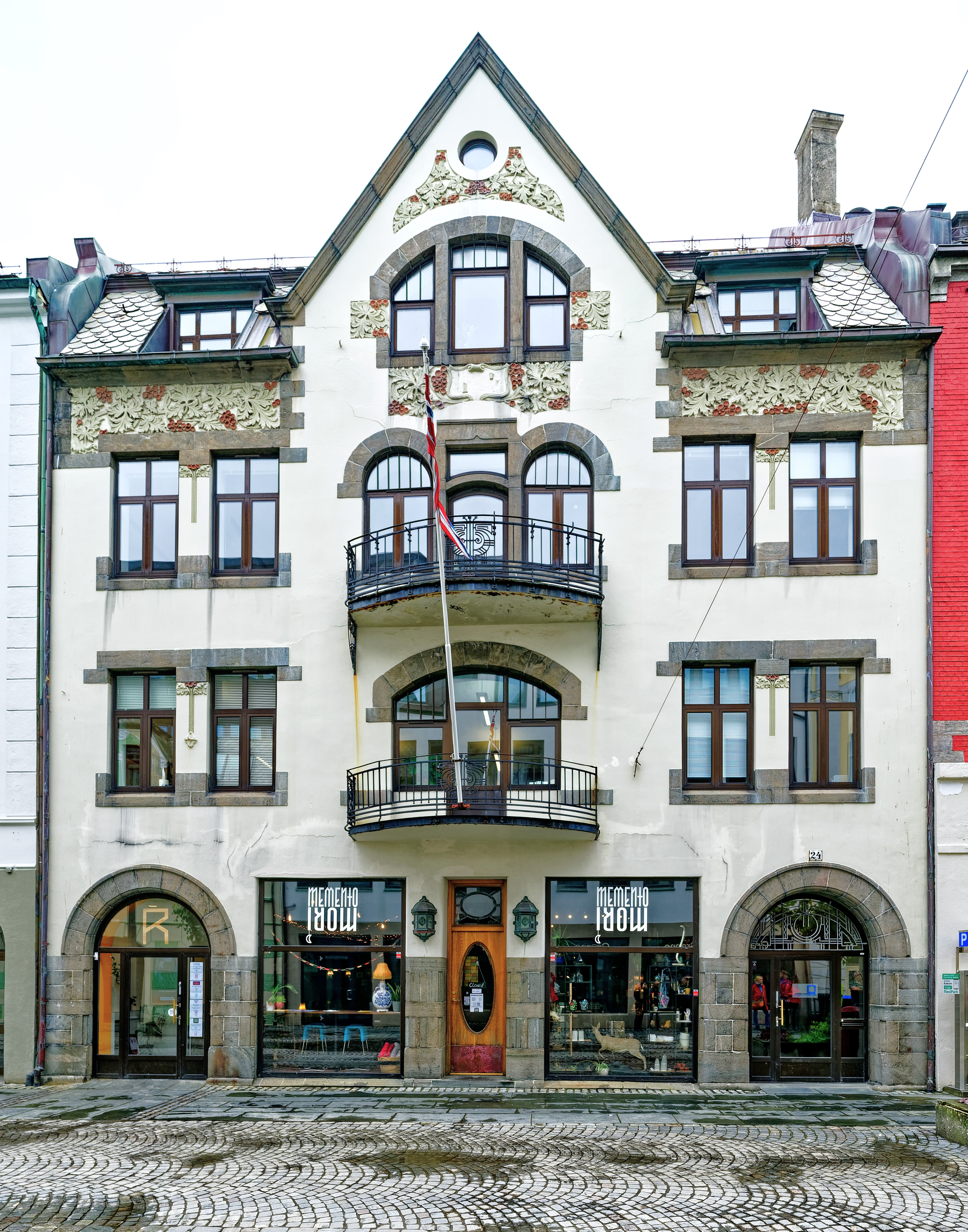
Kongens gate 24, Ålesund (1905)

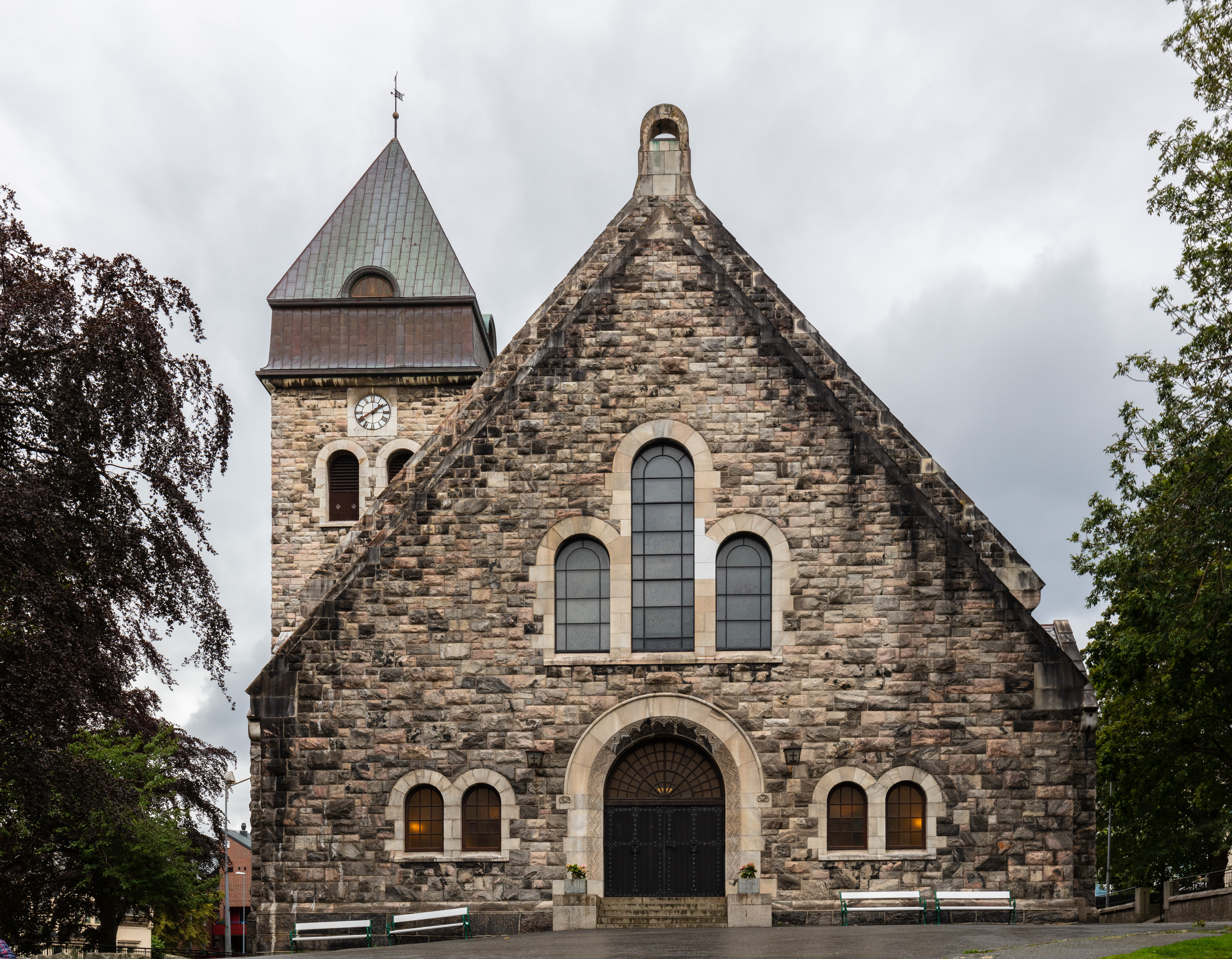
Ålesund Church, (1909)

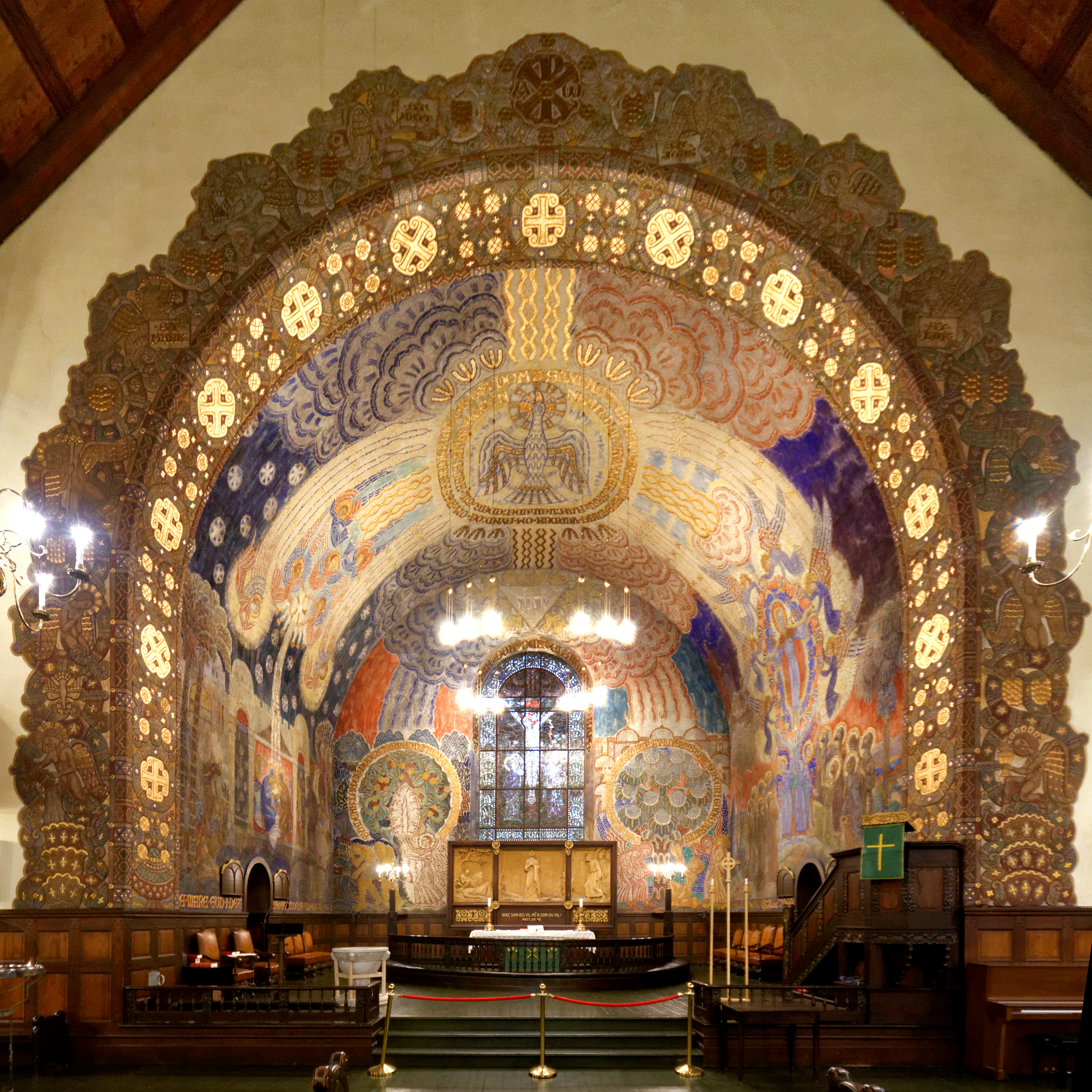
Interior Ålesund Church, (1909)

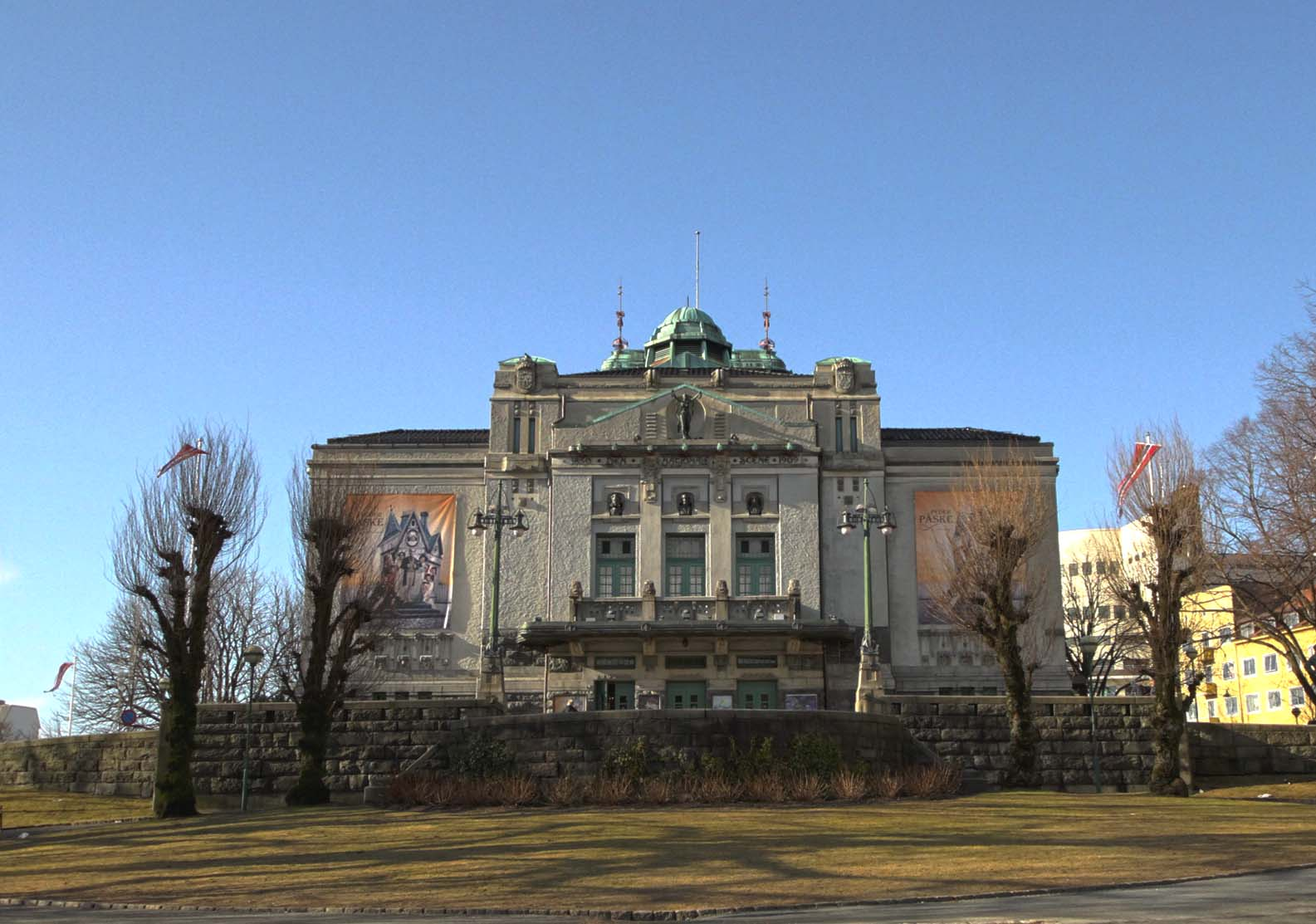
Den Nationale Scene, Bergen; architect: Einar Oscar Schou (1909)

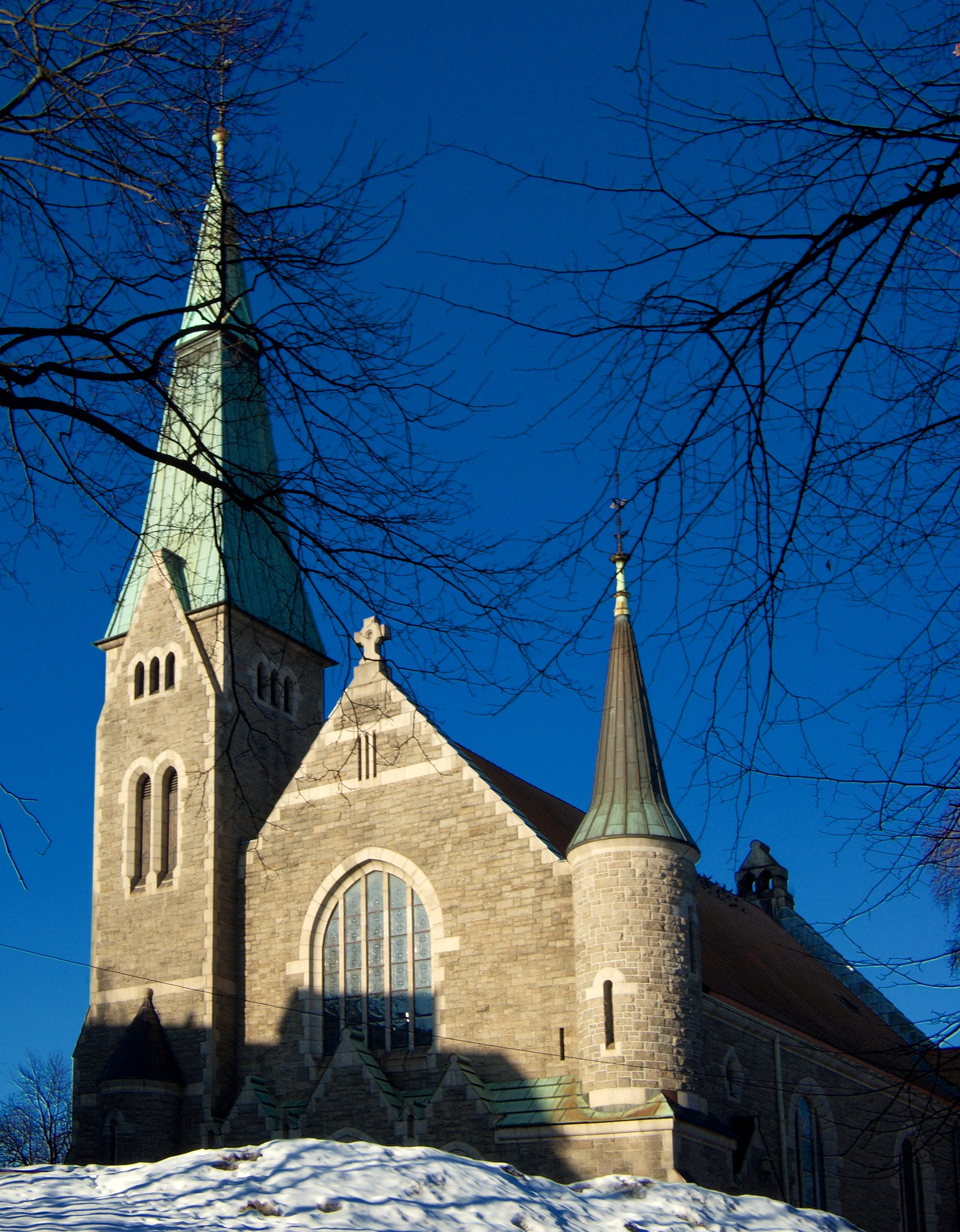
Fagerborg Church, Oslo (1903)

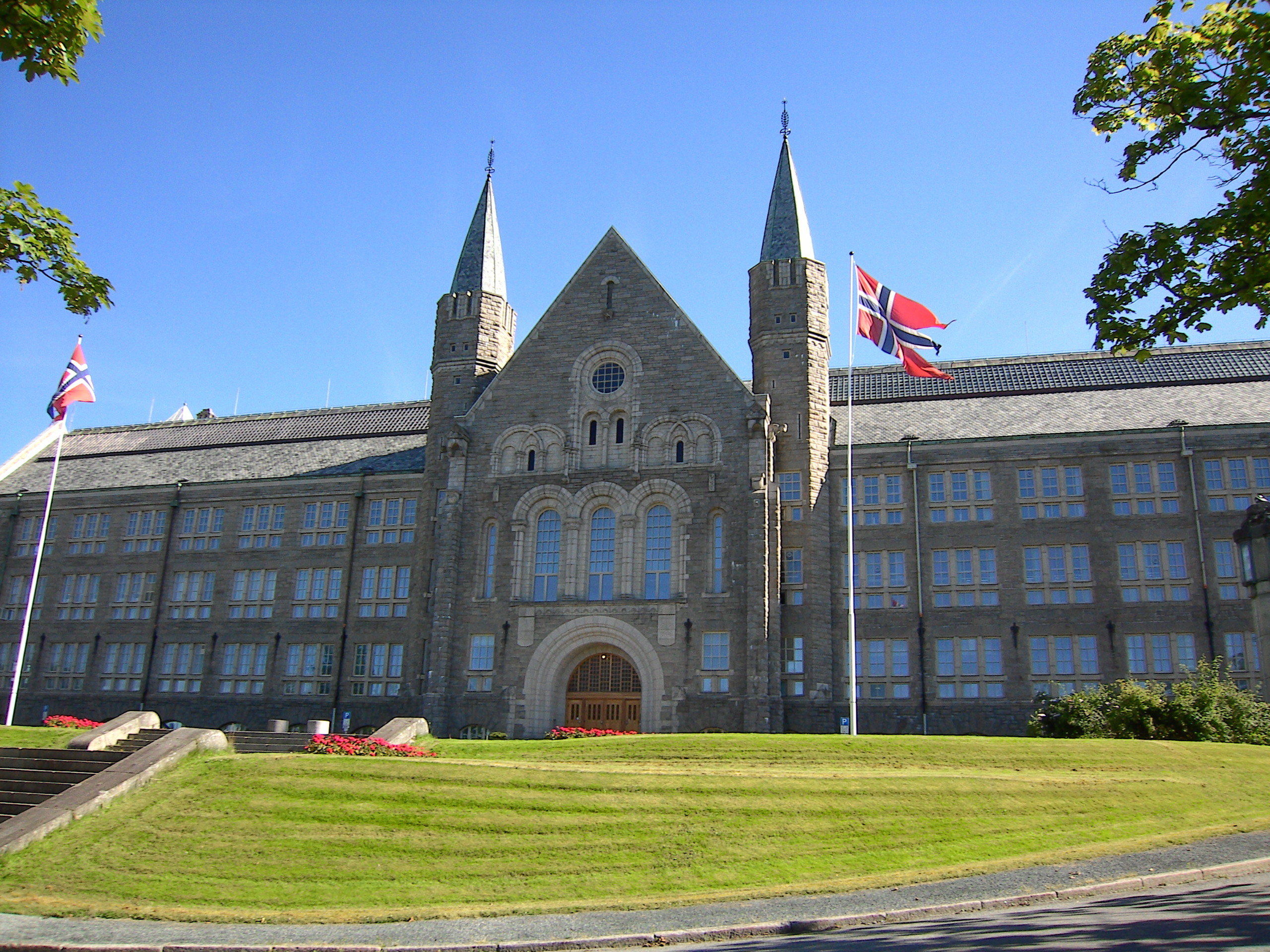
NTNU main building, Trondheim (1910–1915)

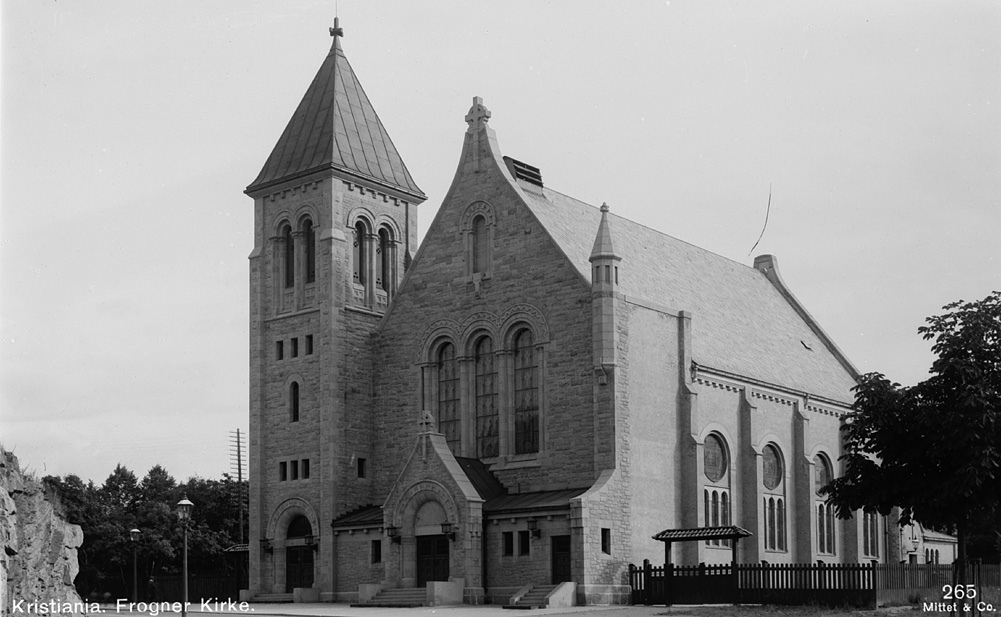
Frogner Church, Oslo (1907)

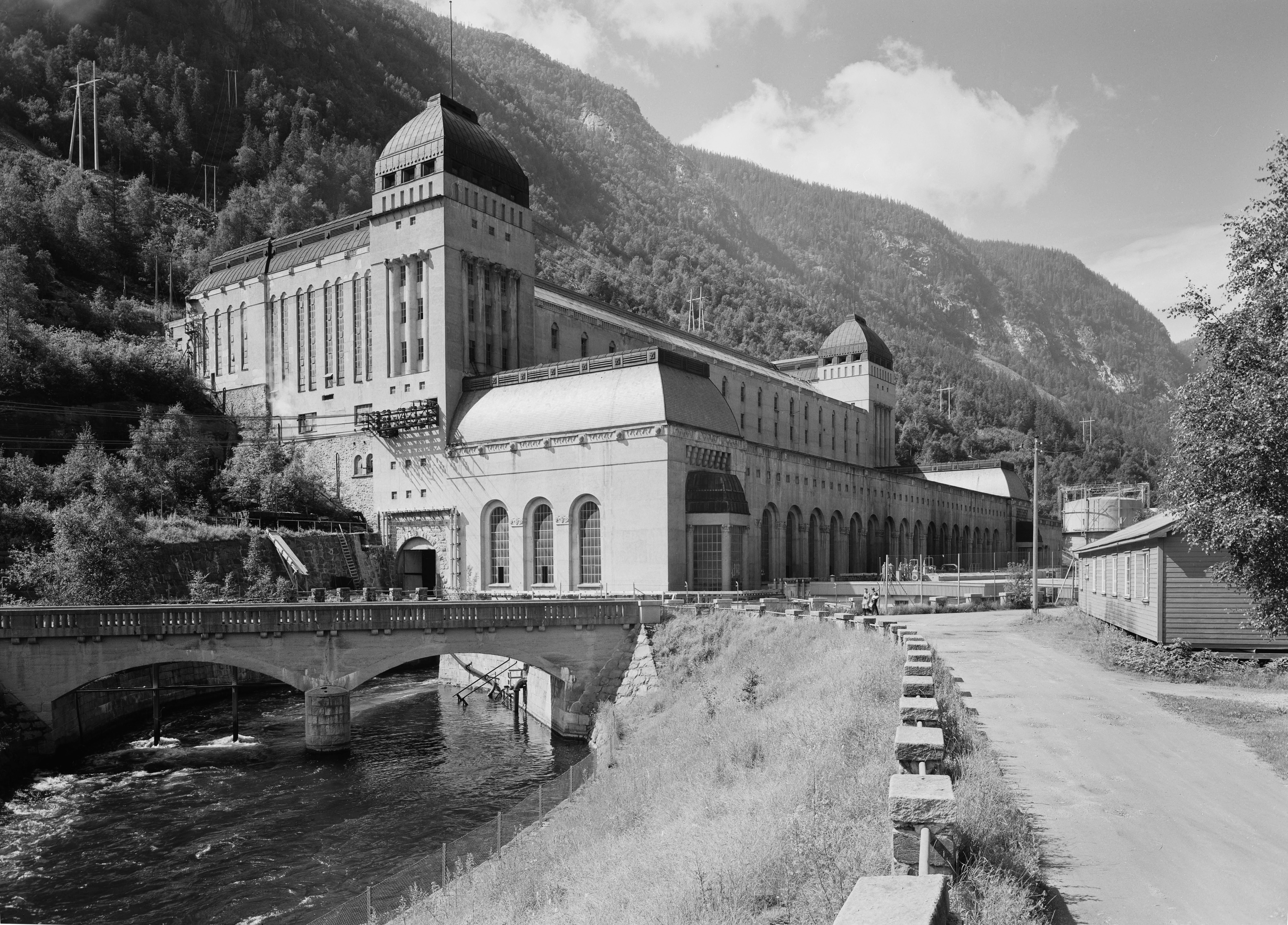
Såheim Hydroelectric Power Station, Rjukan (1915)

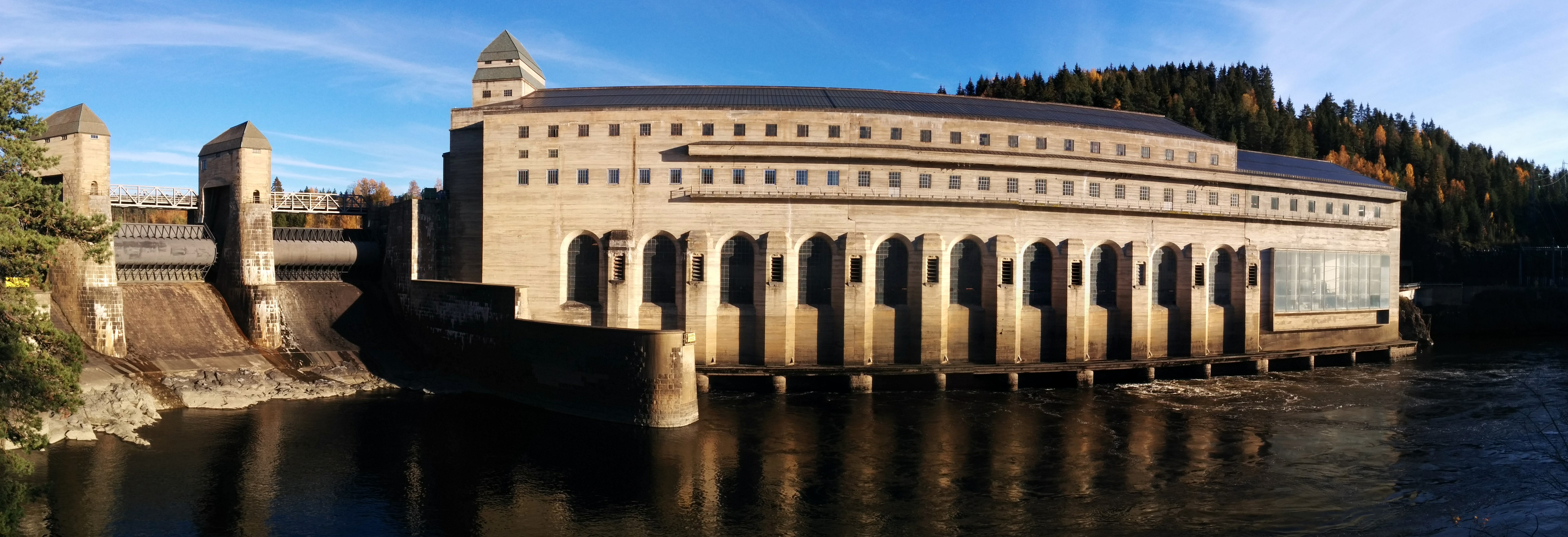
Solbergfoss Hydroelectric Power Station, Indre Østfold (1913–1924)

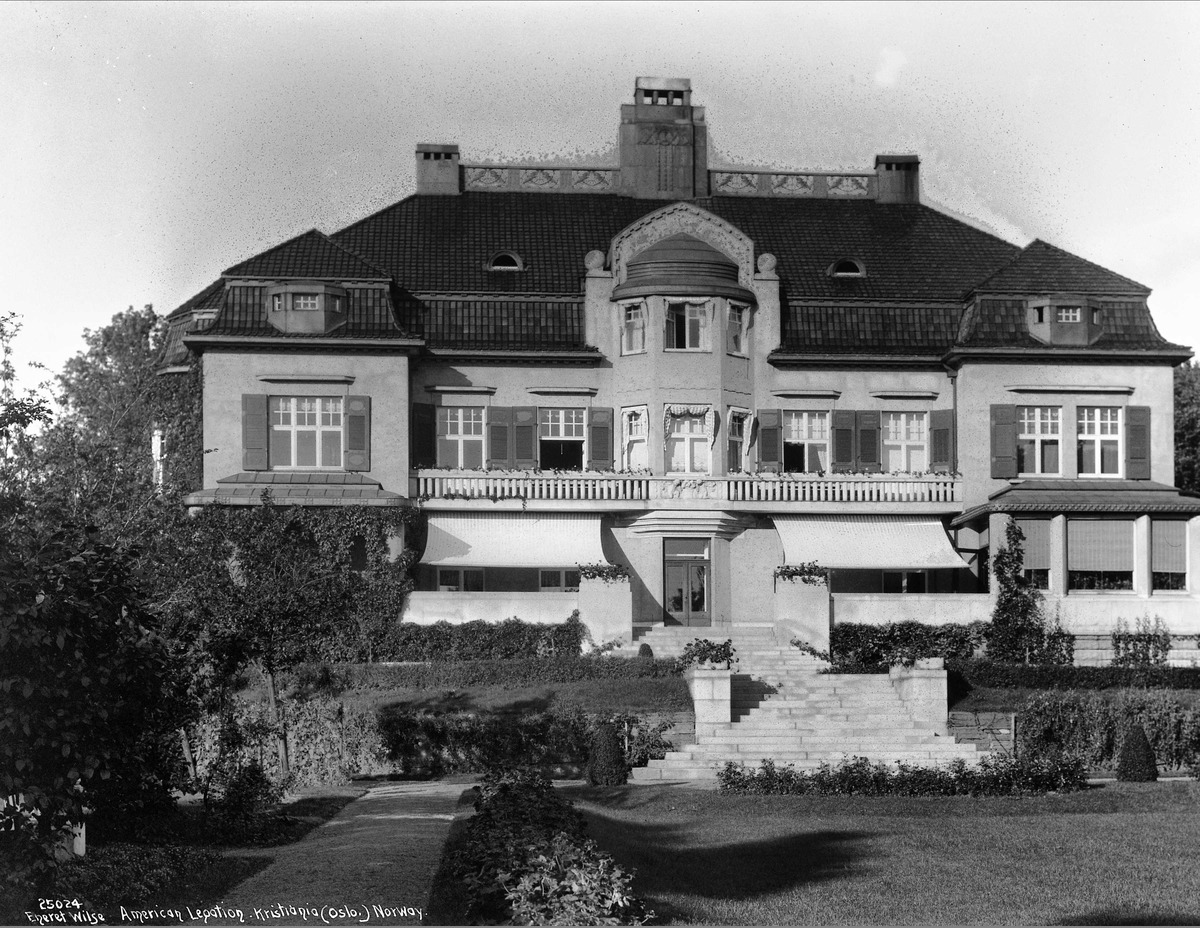
Villa Otium, Oslo (1911)

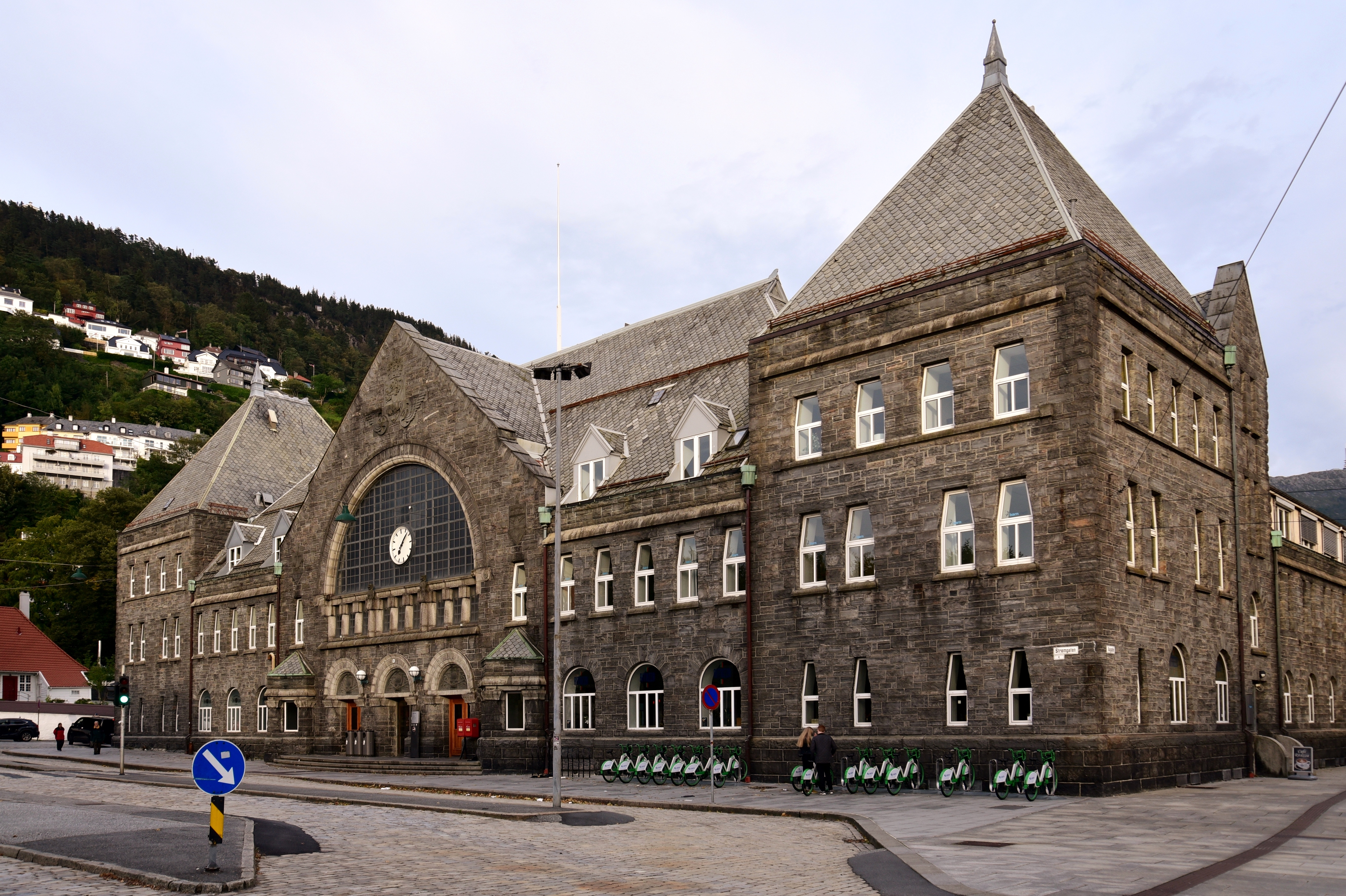
Bergen station (1913)

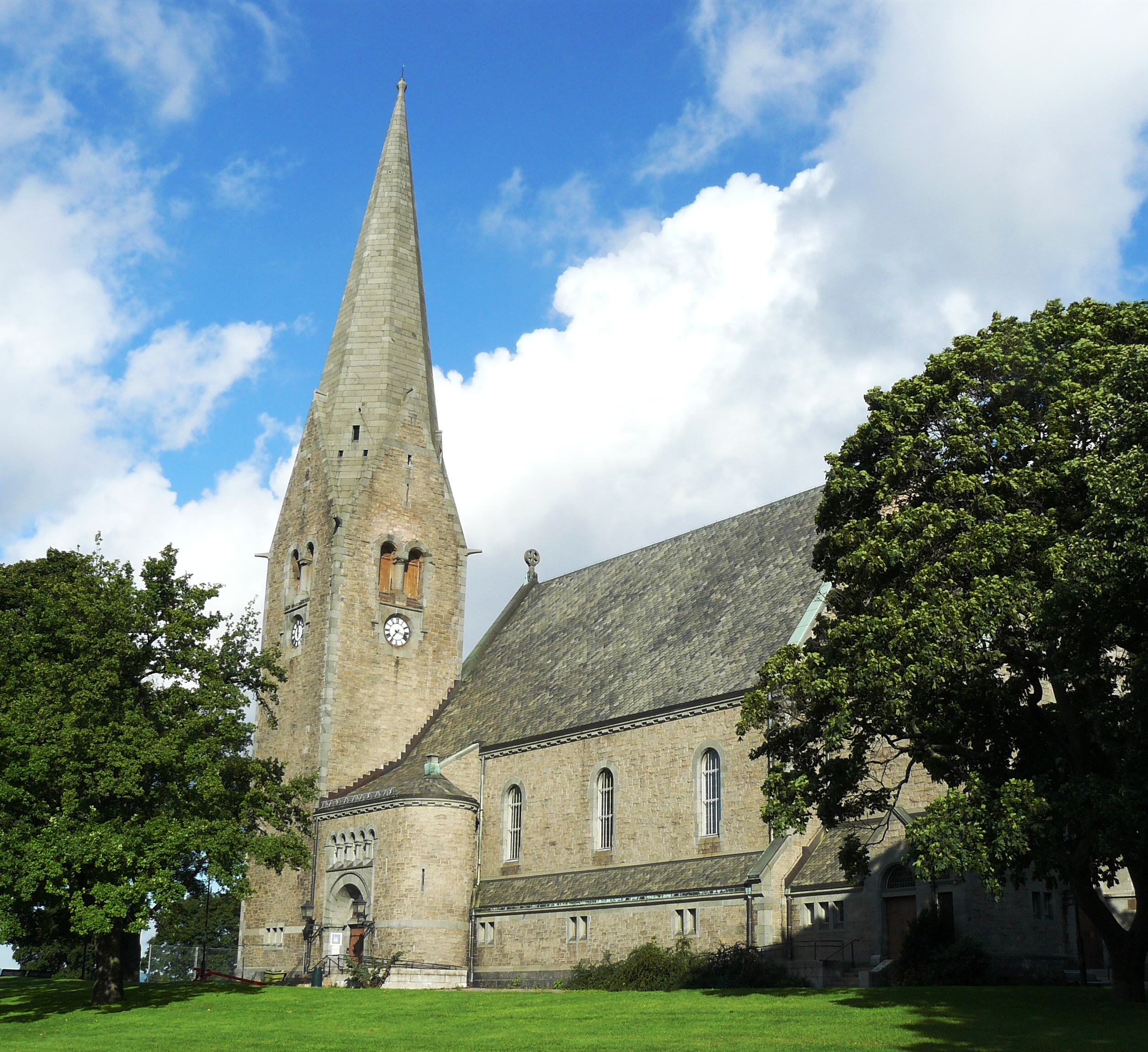
Vålerenga Church, Oslo (1902)

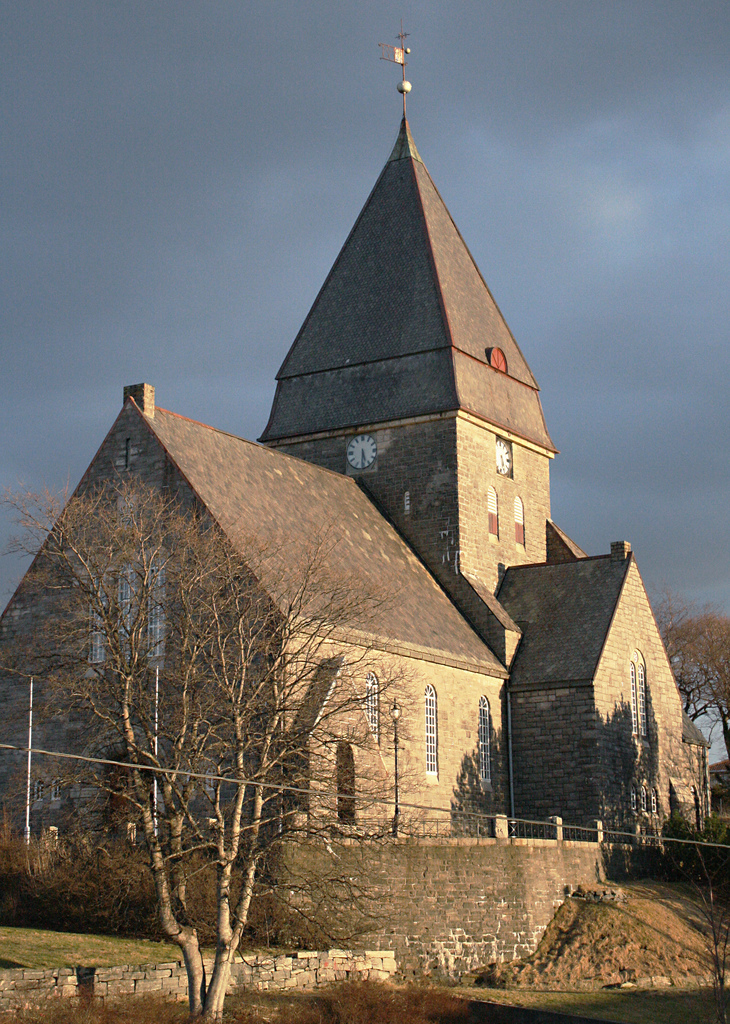
Nordlandet Church, Kristiansund (1914)

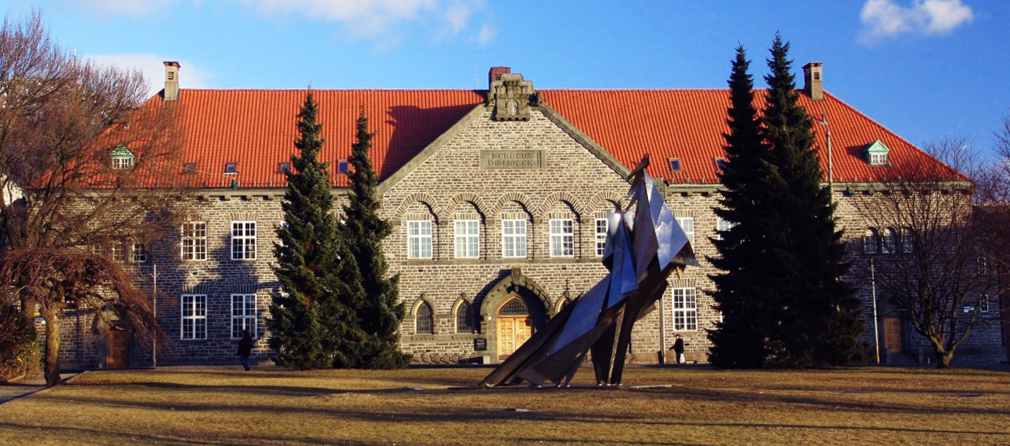
Bergen Public Library, (1917)

==== Mass residential architecture ====
Changing demographics and a growing social awareness led to increased political and architectural interest in providing cost-effective, sanitary, and comfortable residential space to the growing urban population in general and the working class in particular. This was known as boligsaken ("the housing cause") in Norwegian popular culture and continues to play a role to this day.

Not unlike other countries during the evolution of their economies, Architecture became a tool for and manifestation of social policy, with architects and politicians determining just what features were adequate for the intended residents of housing projects. As late as in 1922, there were those who felt that working-class families had no need for their own bath; apartments and small houses only included a small kitchen and one or two rooms.

Before World War II, a number of cooperative investment projects known as "egne hjem" (roughly "our own homes") resulted in a handful of developments, but after the war these gave way to cooperative organizations that were formed to finance and build large-scale residential complexes. The largest—Oslo Bolig og Sparelag, known as OBOS—built its first complex Etterstad in Oslo, but there were similar initiatives throughout the country. These co-ops set standards for housing, hired architects to design solutions, and contracted to have them built. Entire sections, known as drabantbyer—or "satellite cities"—were built in the outskirts of major cities. The first of these, Lambertseter, introduced an entirely new phenomenon in the eastern areas of Oslo such as in Groruddalen, but similar areas also emerged in Bergen, Trondheim, and other cities. The apex of this trend was reached in 1966 with the massive buildings in Ammerudlia.

This era—which had spent most of its force by the mid-1970s—led to an increased awareness of the physical and emotional needs of city dwellers. Some of the issues under debate were.

- Kitchen – traditional Norwegian homes combined the family room and kitchen, but in early apartment buildings, small, so-called "laboratory kitchens" were popular. Over time, eat-in-kitchens took their place.
- Natural light – large apartment buildings were oriented to provide sunlight to the residents, ideally orienting the kitchen toward the east to get the morning light and the living room to the west for evening light.
- Privacy – providing separate sleeping quarters for parents and children, and among children led to larger apartments over time. Similarly, most buildings had a limited number of apartments adjoining each staircase.
- Alienation – monolithic, homogenous apartment complexes reinforced what some characterized as "social democracy's hell."

The perceived shortcomings of the mass housing movement led to efforts to create cost-effective housing solutions that were more varied, more integrated with natural surroundings, and above all more customized to families' needs. In 1973, the Parliament of Norway recommended a shift toward small residential houses rather than large apartment buildings. The Norwegian State Housing Bank (Husbanken) provided citizens with the ability to fund construction of their homes, and an entire construction industry formed to build these needs.

As a result of the pioneering efforts by Olav Selvaag and others, archaic and otherwise unnecessary restrictions were relaxed, improving opportunities for more Norwegians to build housing to suit their individual needs and preferences. Norwegians often undertake home improvement projects on their own, and a number of them have built most of their own homes.

==== Functionalism 1920s–1940 ====
In the late 1920s, Modernism (or the International style) was taken up by Scandinavian architects. In Scandinavia this architectural trend was called Functionalism (or colloquially in Sweden and Norway "funkis"). Modernism found multiple adherents among young architects, especially in Norway. Its definite breakthrough was the Stockholm Exhibition in 1930, after which the majority of architects all over Scandinavia converted to the modern movement. Nowhere else did Modernism become so firmly established as the mainstream trend in architecture. It maintained its dominant position until about 1940.

A number of landmark structures, particularly in Oslo, were built in the functionalist style, with the major example being the monumental Oslo City Hall, by Arnstein Arneberg and Magnus Poulsson. The first one was the Skansen restaurant (1925–1927) by Lars Backer, demolished in 1970. Backer also designed the restaurant at Ekeberg, opened in 1929. The art gallery Kunstnernes Hus by Gudolf Blakstad and Herman Munthe-Kaas (1930) still shows influence from the preceding classicist trend of the 1920s. Hvalstrand bath (1934) is one of several public seaside bath facilities in Norway, by André Peters. A year before, Ingierstrand Bad was designed by Ole Lind Schistad (1891–1979) and Eivind Moestue (1893–1977). Other great names of Norwegian functionalist architecture are Ove Bang, Maja Melandsø, Fridtjof Reppen, Nicolai Beer (1885–1950) and Per Grieg (1897–1962).

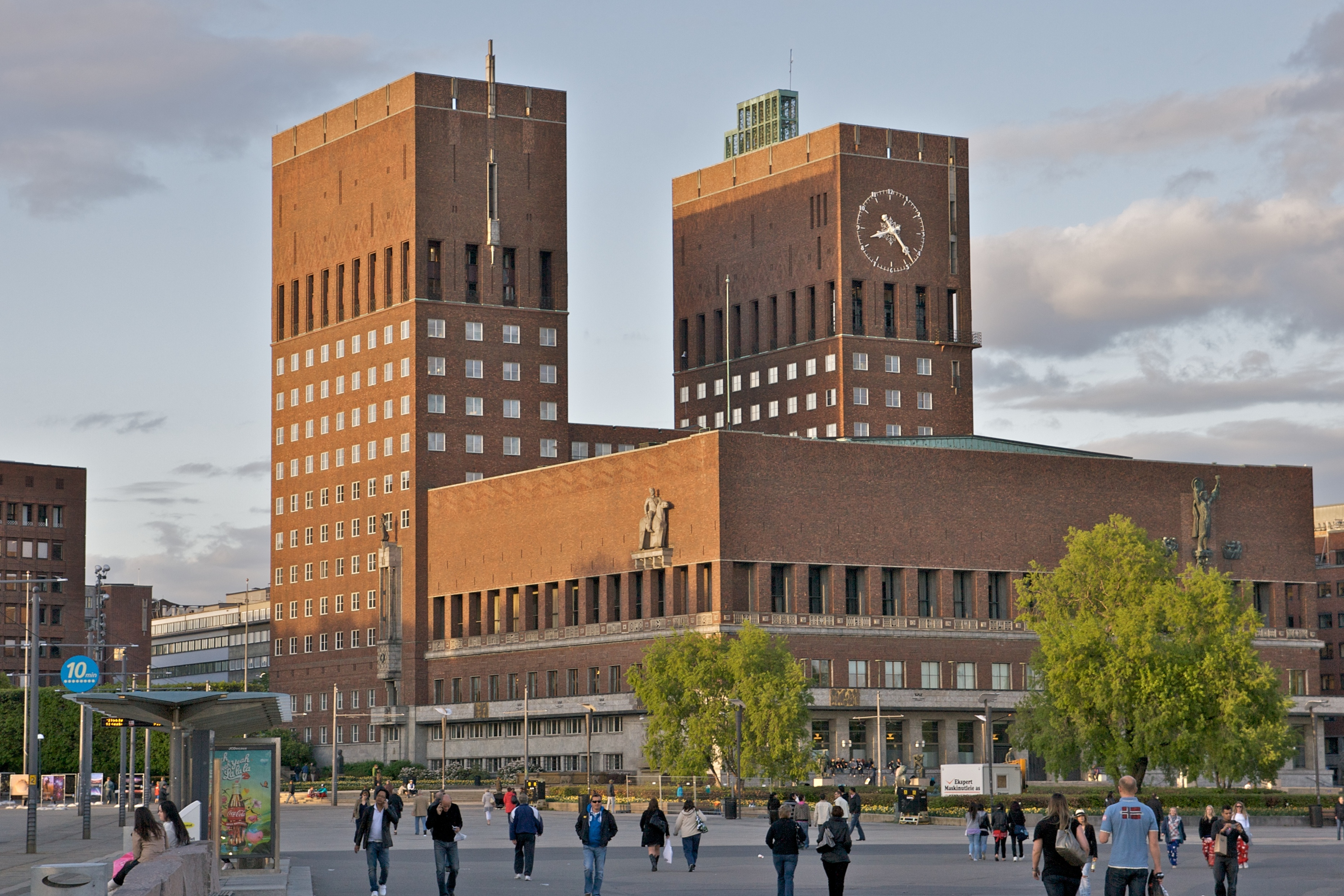
Oslo City Hall; architects: Arnstein Arneberg and Magnus Poulsson

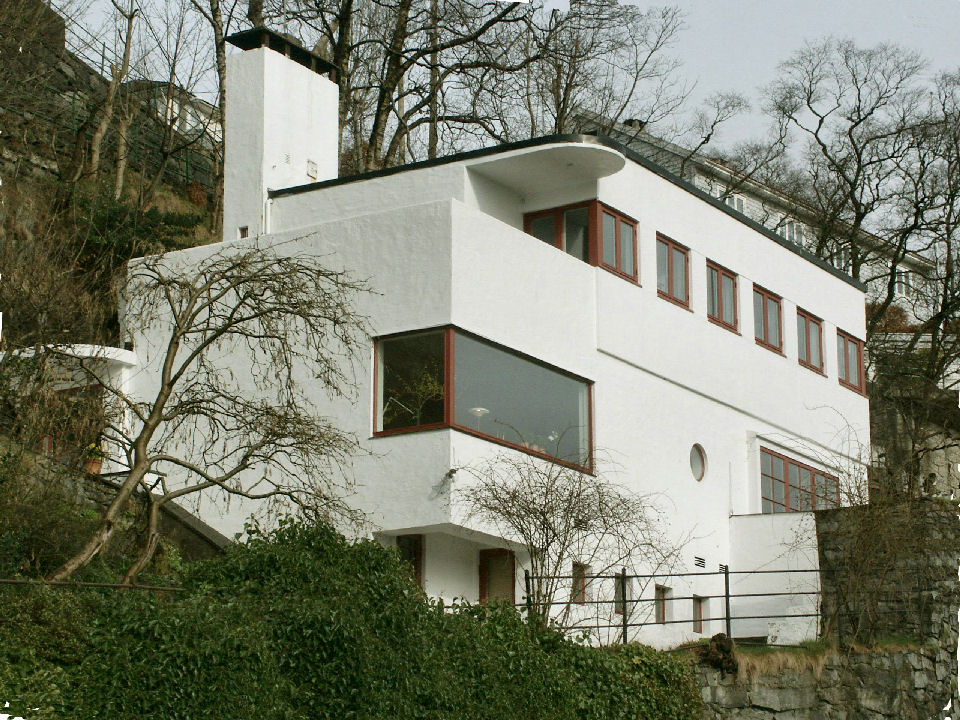
Villa Eide in Bergen; architect: Leif Grung

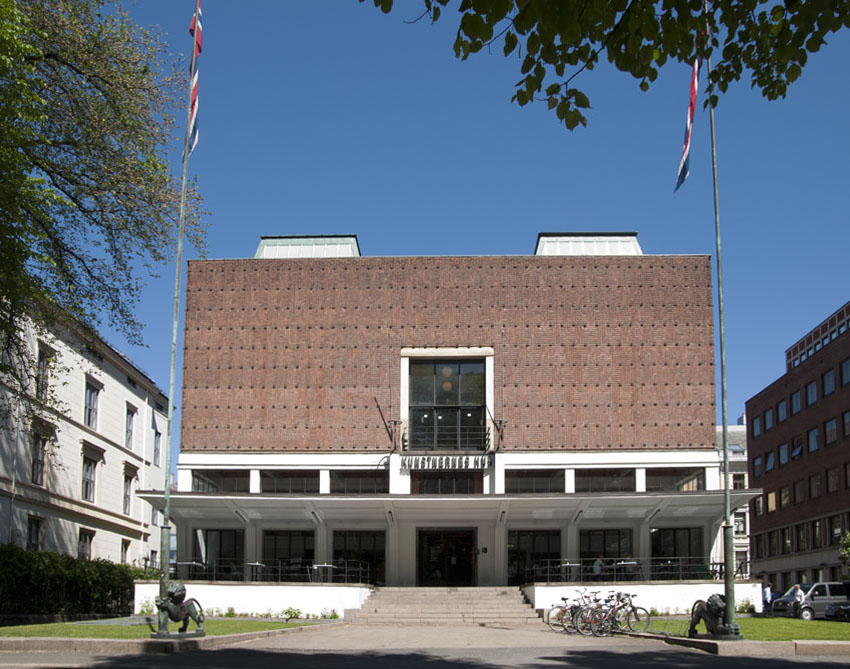
Kunstnernes Hus; architects: Gudolf Blakstad and Herman Munthe-Kaas

==== Reconstruction architecture post World War II ====
The cities of Bodø, Kristiansund, Narvik, Namsos, Steinkjær, Molde and others were heavily destroyed by German bombing campaigns in 1940 during the Nazi invasion of Norway. Later, parts of Bergen were also severely damaged by Royal Air Force bombing and a German munitions accident in 1944. The post-war reconstruction efforts that followed played a crucial role in reshaping these cities. The city centre of Molde is today one of the best preserved examples of reconstruction architecture in Norway.

Following the scorched earth tactics of retreating Wehrmacht troops 1944-1945, large areas in Northern Norway needed to be rebuilt. In 1945, there was an overwhelming need for housing, with 20,000 homes lost, 12,000 in Finnmark alone. The Directorate of Reconstruction announced a competition in the fall of 1945 to find cost-effective house designs suitable for prefabrication and rapid assembly. The houses were to be up to 60 square meters with a simple layout and form, and they were to be suitable for prefabricated production in elements or sections. The result was a series of fairly similar houses across the entire region, not necessarily up to building standards, but met an immediate need for shelter. The previously diverse architecture, influenced by both Finnish and Russian building traditions, disappeared. What remained were simple but functional houses, known as "reconstruction houses." These houses typically featured a kitchen, a small bedroom, a pantry, a living room, and a hallway on the ground floor, with at least two bedrooms on the second floor. The Museum of Reconstruction in Hammerfest is dedicated to the post-war reconstruction in the North.

The main archititectural style in the reconstruction was a continuation of functionalism, which suited government policy of restricted use of building materials. Residental housing often had vernicular interpretations of functionalist principles.

==== Late Functionalism 1945–1960 ====
Late Functionalism (Norwegian: senfunkis) refers to the architectural style that dominated Norwegian design from the end of World War II until around 1960. This style is a continuation of pre-war Functionalism, which prioritized simplicity and utility, but adapted to the specific social and economic conditions of post-war Norway. Unlike early Bauhaus-inspired Functionalism, Late Functionalism did not reject ornamentation. Public buildings from this period often feature decorative elements such as sculptures, reliefs, and striking murals or frescoes.

The 1952 Winter Olympics held in Oslo was a significant moment, not only in terms of sports but also for architecture and design. Frode Rinnan was the main architect for the games, and the centerpiece of the 1952 Olympics was the Holmenkollen Ski Jump, one of Norway's most iconic sports venues. It was extensively renovated for the Olympics, and the upgraded ski jump featured a minimalist, functional design. Another important venue during the 1952 Olympics was the Bislett Stadium, which was used for speed skating events. Originally built in 1922, the stadium was expanded and renovated for the Games. Functionalist principles were also evident in the design for the Games, from the posters to the Olympic torch created by architect Geir Grung.

One of the most significant contributions of Norwegian Late Functionalism to international architecture is the interior design of the United Nations Security Council Chamber in New York, completed in 1952 as gift from the Norwegian state. The chamber was designed by the renowned Norwegian architect Arnstein Arneberg, who was tasked with creating a space that reflected the values of peace, cooperation, and functionality. In line with Late Functionalism, the room is adorned with patterned wallpapers and a large mural by the artist Per Krohg.

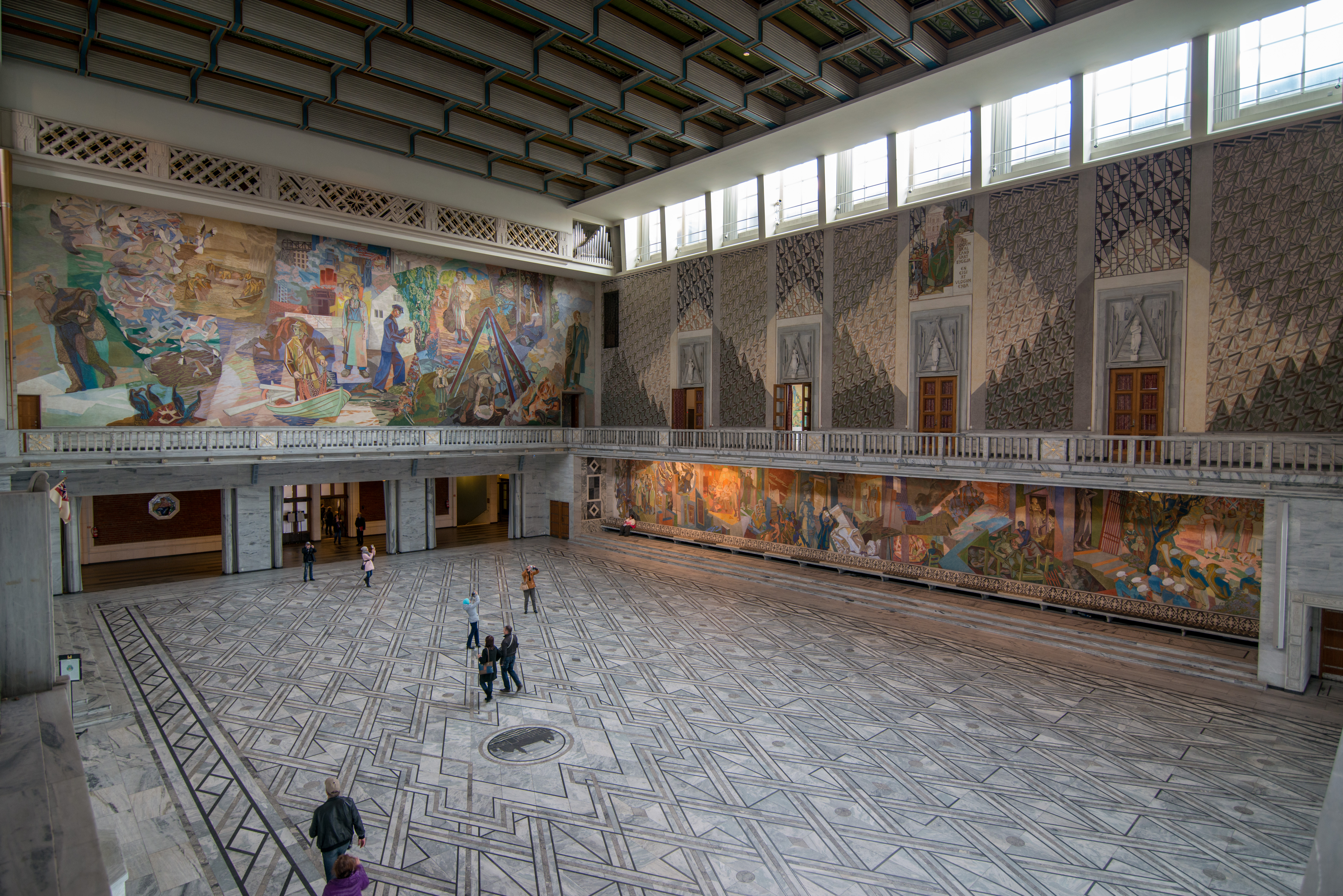
The interior of Oslo City Hall, by Arnstein Arneberg and Magnus Poulsson (1945–1950)

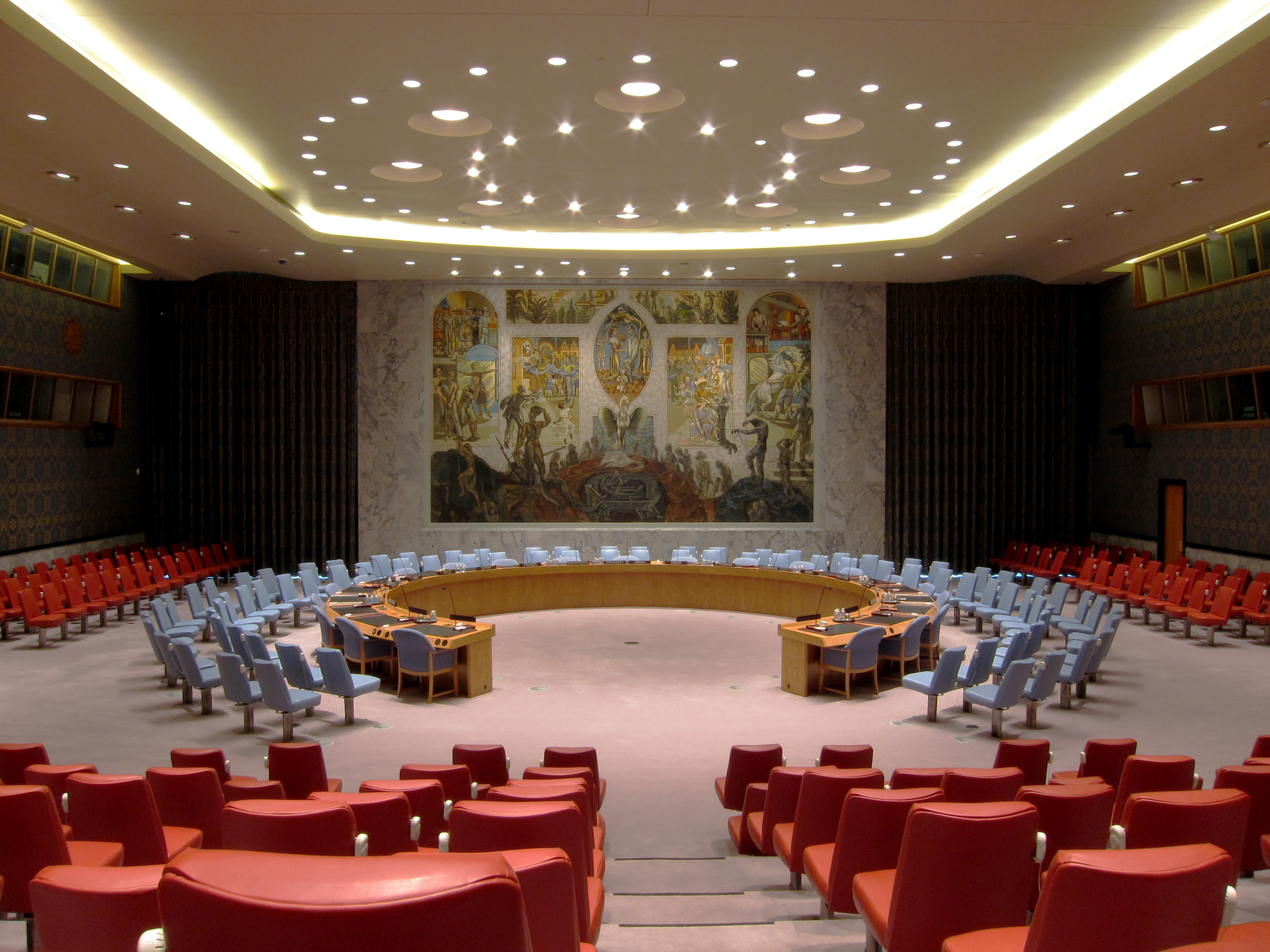
Interior of the UN Security Council Chamber, New York, by Arnstein Arneberg (1952)

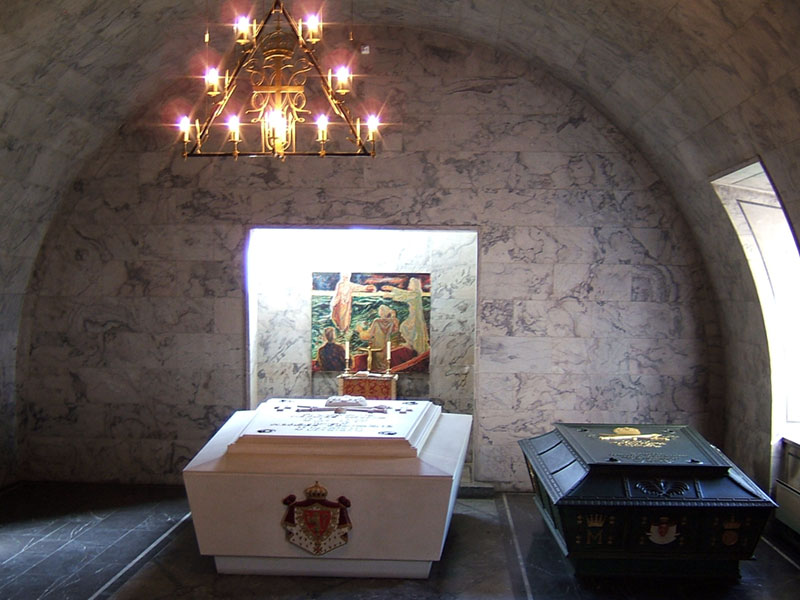
Interior of the Royal Mausoleum, Oslo by Arnstein Arneberg (1948)

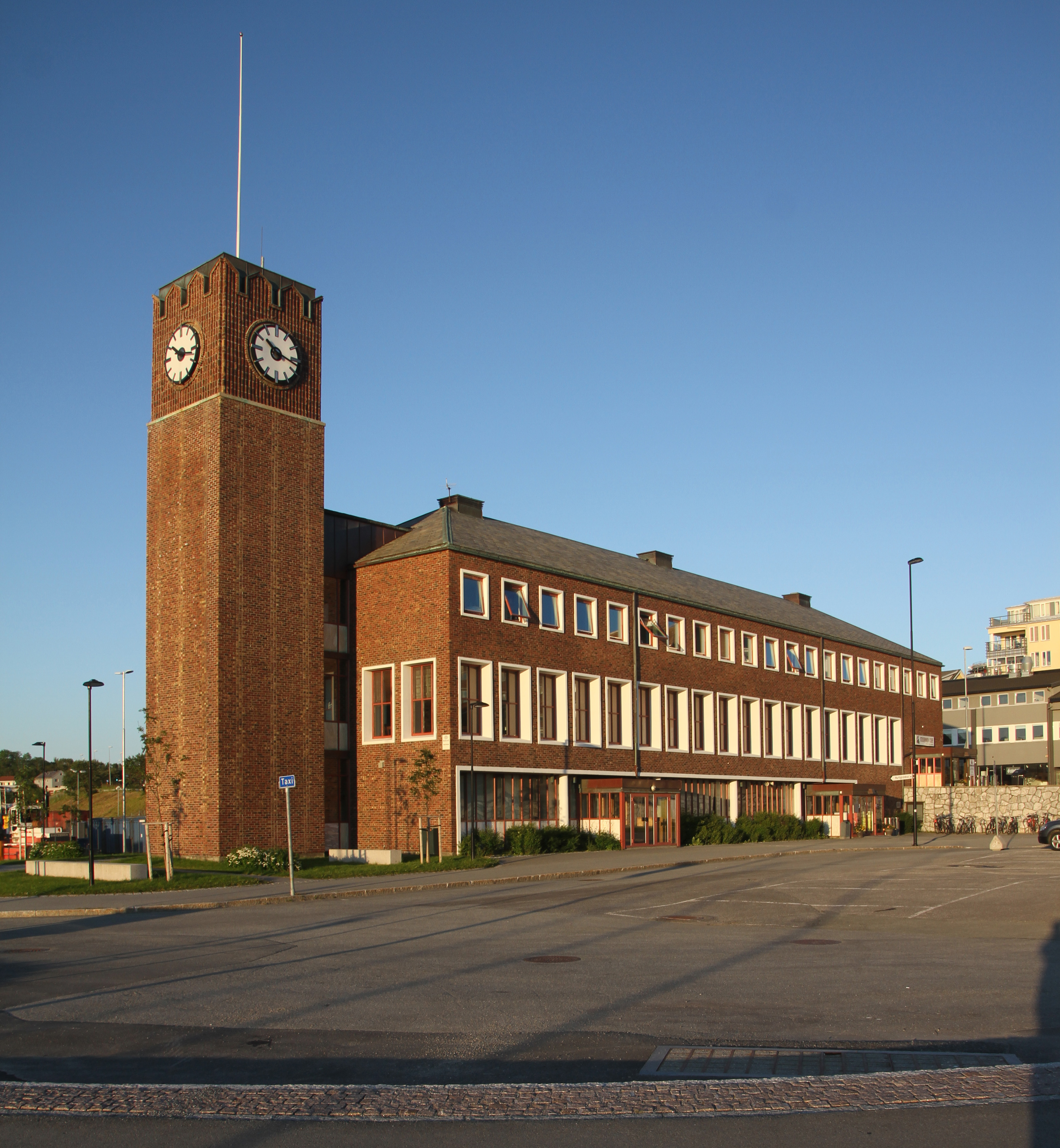
Bodø Station, by Arvid Sundby (1961)

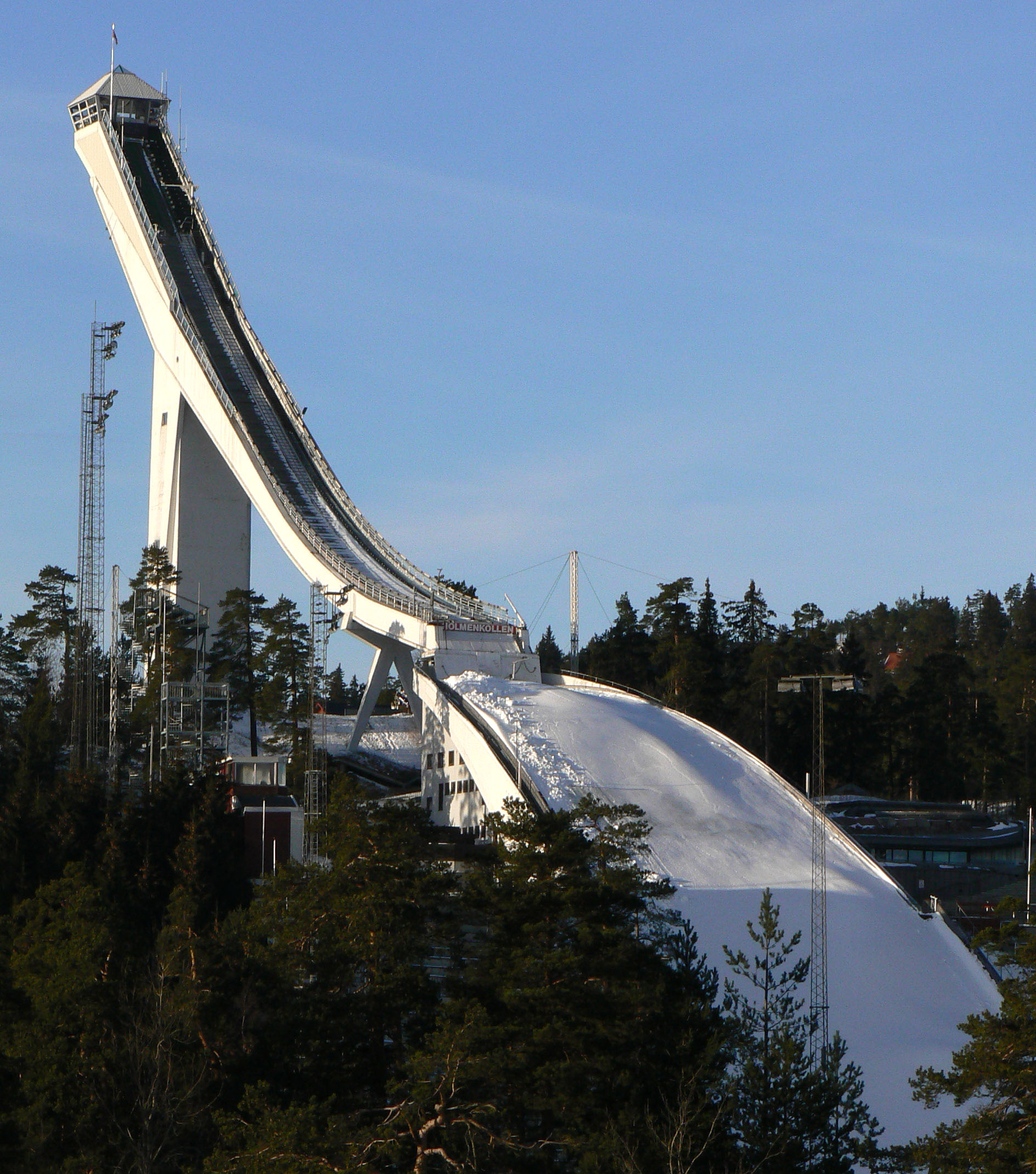
Old Holmenkollen Ski Jump, Oslo by Frode Rinnan (1952, demolished 2007)

==== Mid-Century Modernism 1950s–1970s ====
Post-war modernist architecture in Norway took on a more international perspective, deeply influenced by the global Mid-century modern aesthetic. This new direction emphasized simplicity, light-filled interiors, and the use of natural materials like wood, glass, and concrete.

In residential architecture, the era was defined by a commitment to rational design, industrial production, and cost-efficiency. Ornamentation was kept to a minimum, while contrasting materials like limestone bricks and dark wood added visual interest to façades. Multiple houses were built using prefabricated wall sections, though architect-designed homes stood out for their attention to detail and premium materials. Today, these villas are among the most sought-after properties in Norway.

Norway gained international recognition in the field of interior and furniture design during this era. Norwegian production of Mid-century modern furniture are known for clean lines, organic forms, and functional designs, using high-quality materials like teak, oak, and leather. Prominent designers are Fredrik A. Kayser, Sven Ivar Dysthe, Olav Haug, Arne Halvorsen and Torbjørn Afdal. Norwegian Mid-century modern furniture remains highly sought-after today, valued by collectors and design enthusiasts both in Norway and abroad, solidifying its place in global design history.

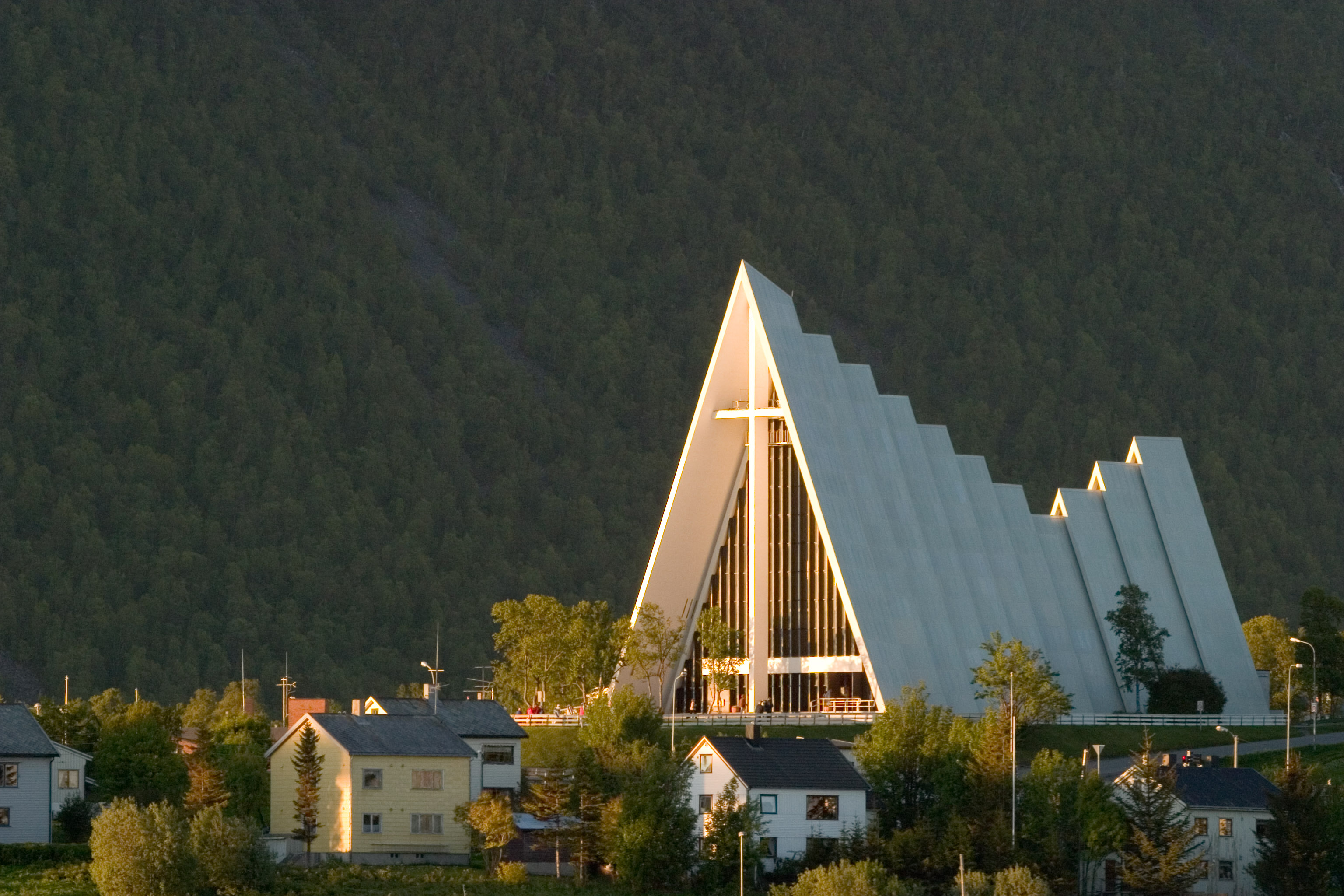
Arctic Cathedral, Tromsø by Jan Inge Hovig (1965)

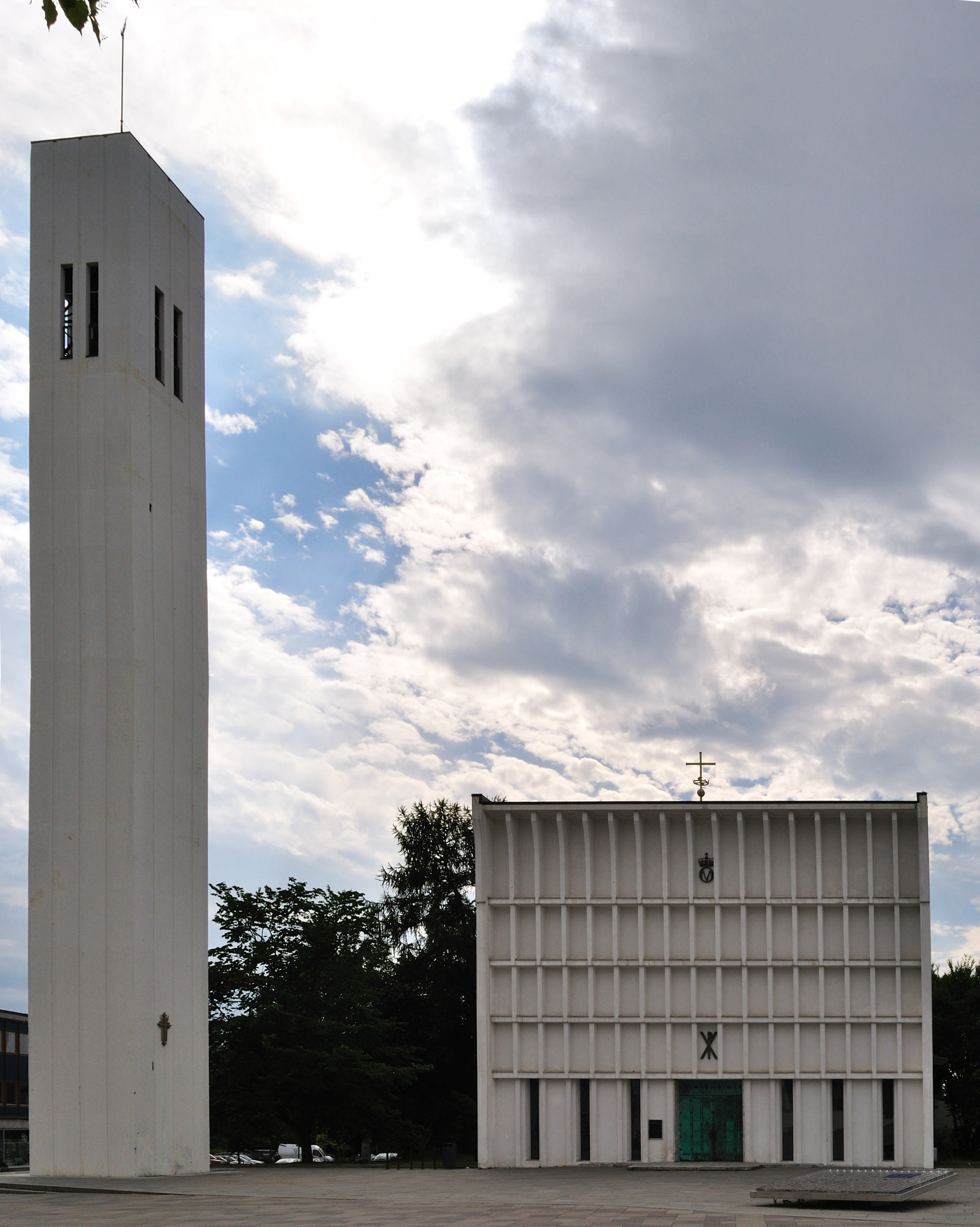
Steinkjer Church by Olav S. Platou (1965)

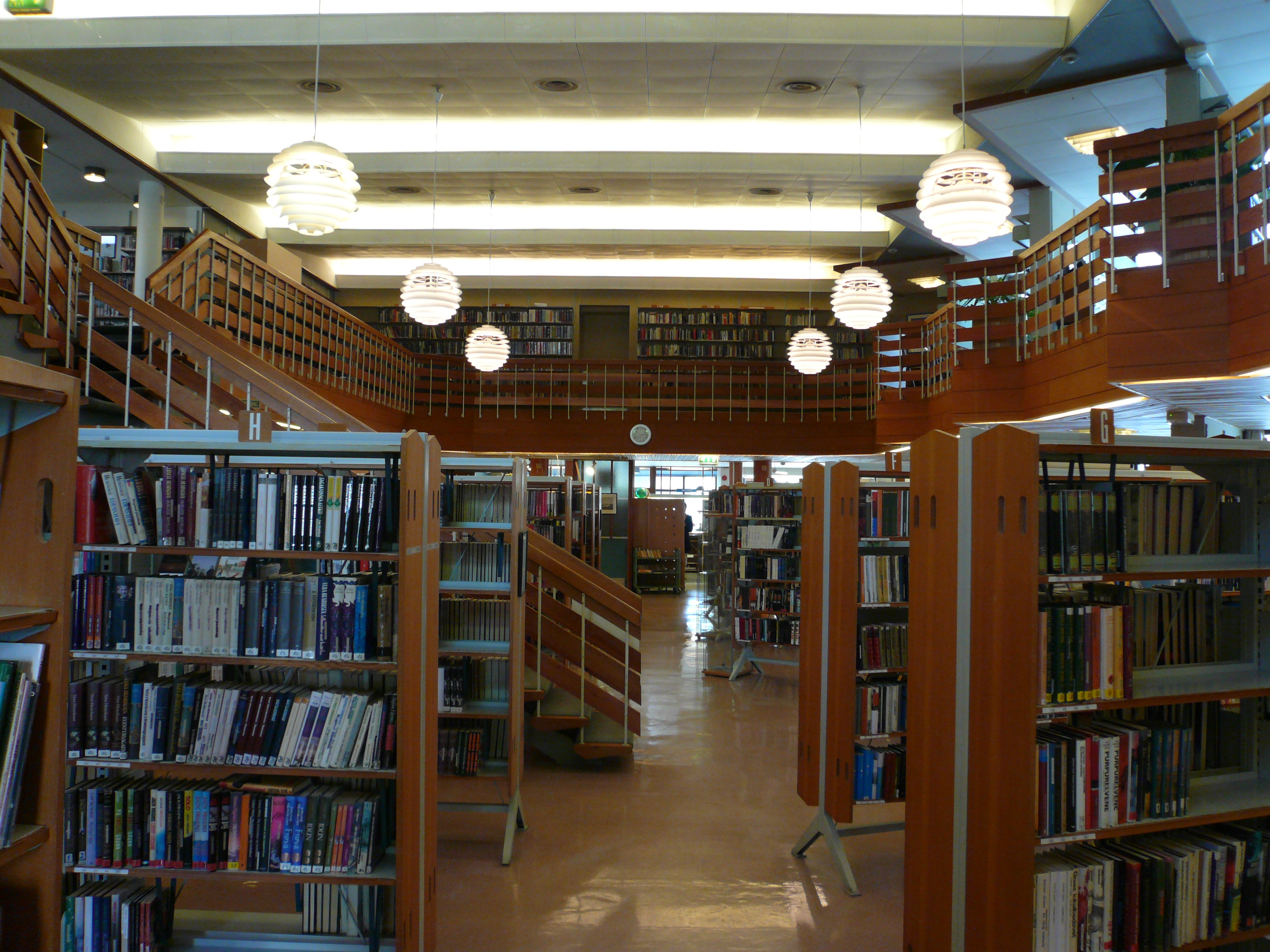
Interior of Haugesund Public Library, Haugesund, by David Sandved (1967)

==== Brutalist architecture 1950s–1970s ====
Brutalist architecture, characterized by its raw concrete forms and modular elements, found a distinct expression in Norway during the post-war period and particularly with the rise of the social democratic state. A number of significant buildings were constructed in the Brutalist style. Among the most notable examples are the H-Block and Y-Block (1959 and 1970, respectively), both designed by Erling Viksjø. These buildings, located in the heart of Oslo as part of the main offices of the Norwegian government, featured murals by Pablo Picasso, integrated into the concrete surfaces.

Erling Viksjø was the leading figure in Norwegian Brutalism, with other notable architects including Nils Slaatto and Kjell Lund. Although Brutalism enjoyed popularity for two decades, it also sparked debate and criticism for its perceived coldness, austerity, and lack of human scale. The Government Quarter suffered permanent damage in the 2011 terror attacks, and were ultimately demolished in 2020, a decision that underscored the ongoing tensions surrounding Brutalism's legacy in Norway.

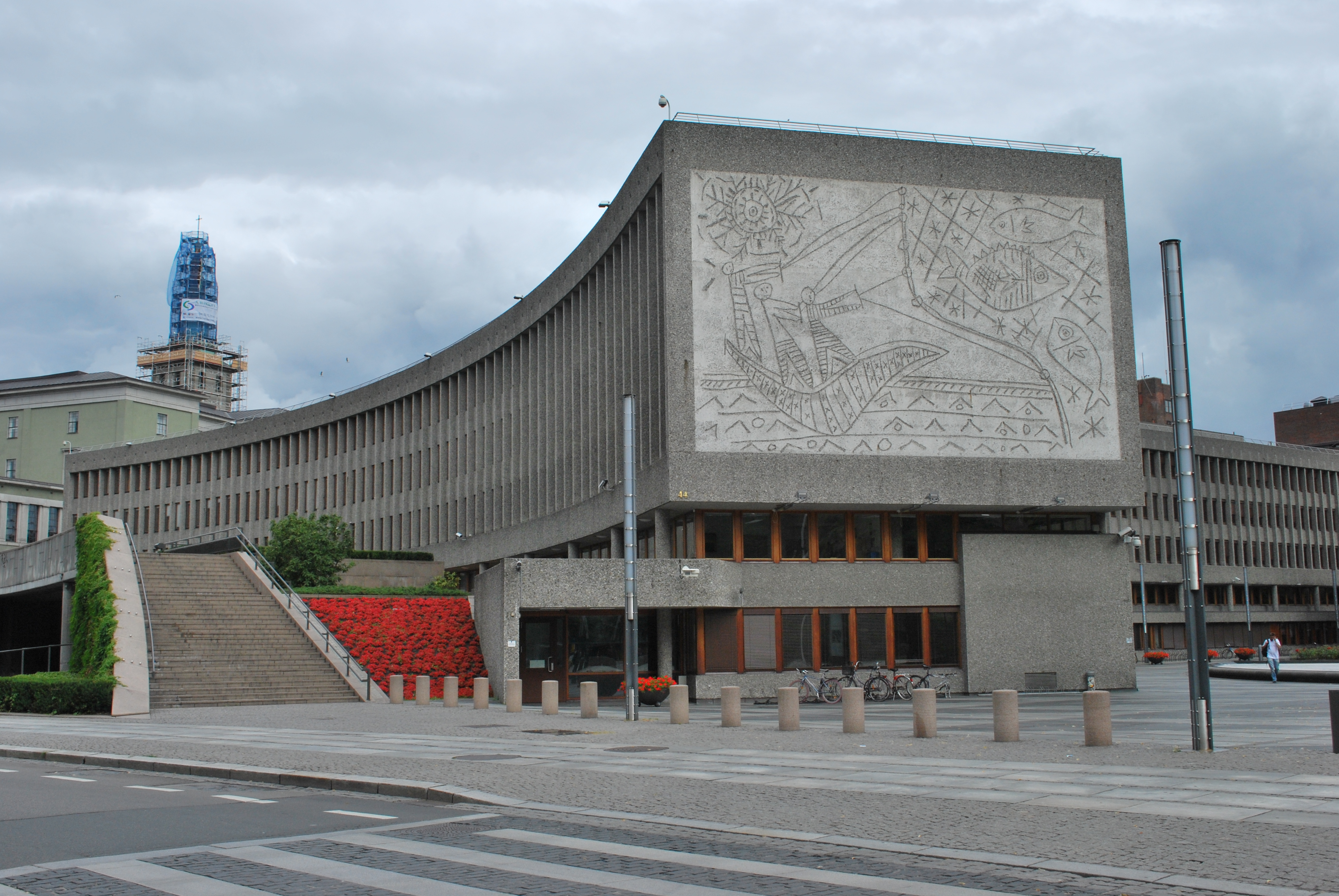
Y-Block, Oslo, by Erling Viksjø (1970, demolished 2020)

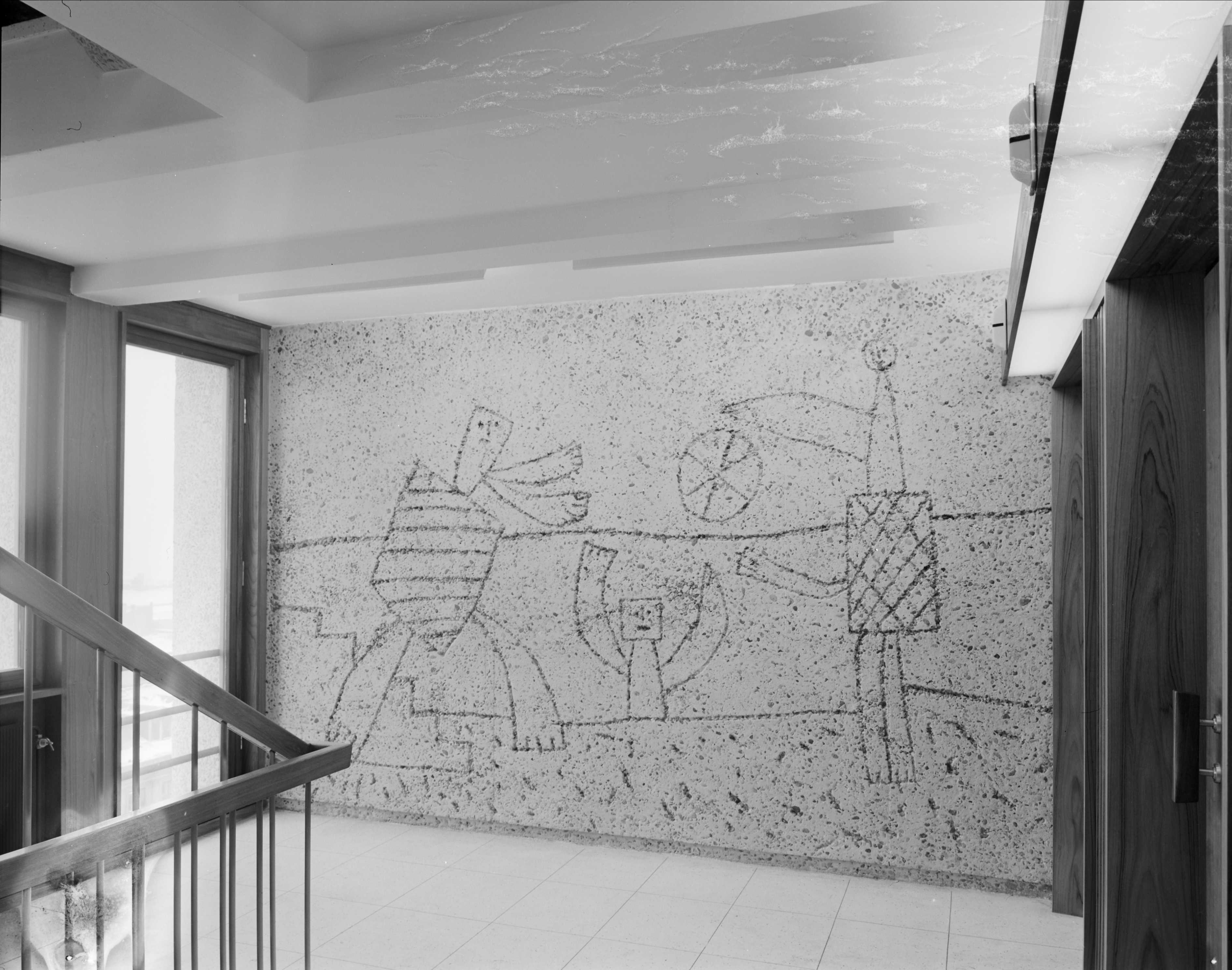
Interior of the H-Block, Oslo, by Erling Viksjø (1959, demolished 2020); sandblasted relief by Pablo Picasso

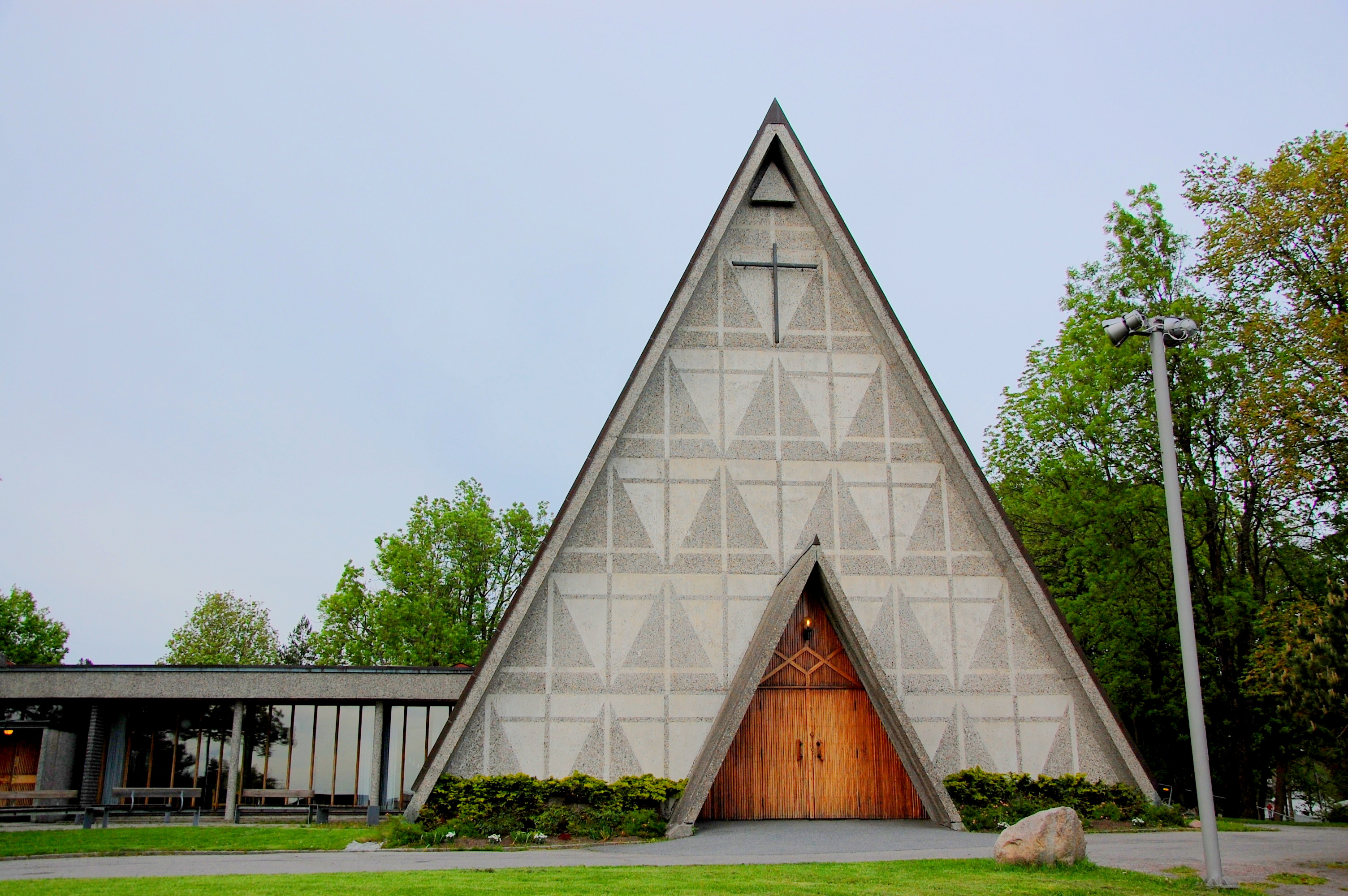
Bakkehaugen Church by Ove Bang and Erling Viksjø (1959)

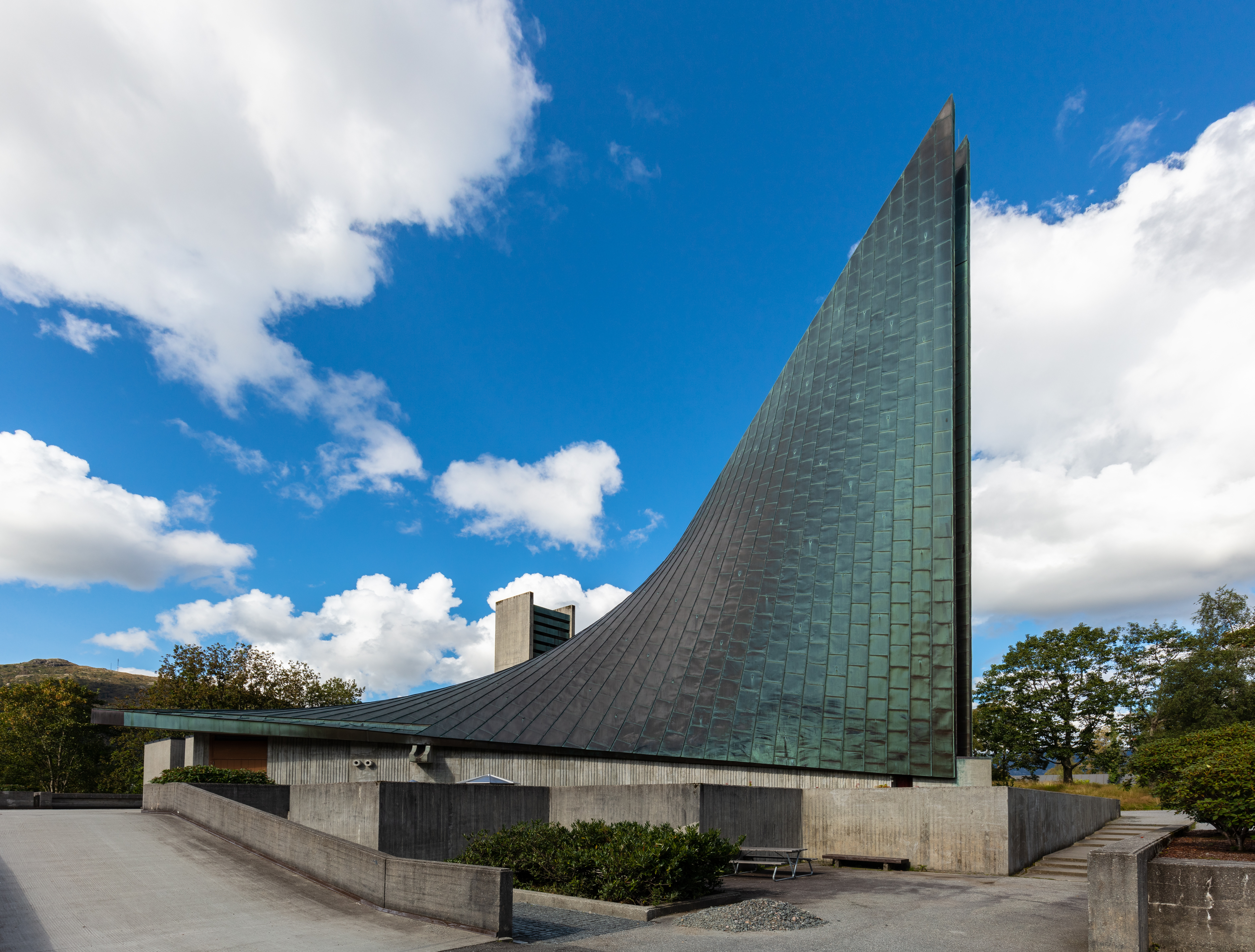
Slettebakken Church, Bergen, by Tore Sveram (1970)

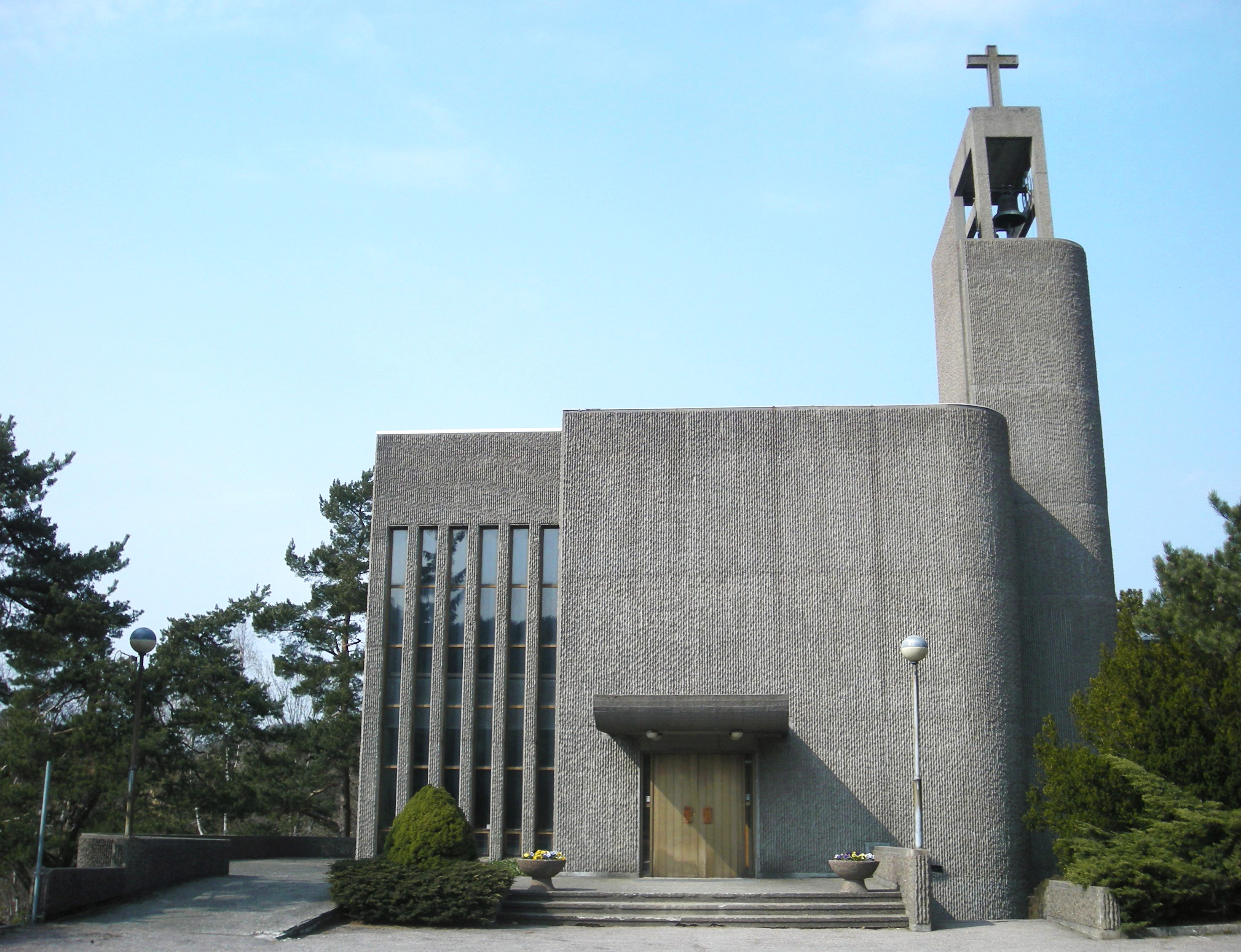
Grim Church, Kristiansand, by Alv Erikstad (1970)

==== Postmodern Architecture 1980s-1990s ====
Postmodern architecture in Norway was particularly visible in commercial and public buildings from the 1980s and 1990s. Notable examples include the Oslo Plaza Hotel (1990) by White Arkitekter, a striking high-rise with a mix of geometric forms and reflective surfaces. The rise of postmodern architecture in Norway coincided with the country's economic transformation following the discovery of North Sea oil in the late 1960s. As Norway became an oil-rich nation, wealth from petroleum exports fueled urban expansion, infrastructure projects, and corporate developments, a number of which embraced postmodern architectural styles during the 1980s and 1990s. Stavanger, the oil capitol of Norway, saw a number of new prominent postmodern buildings connected to the petroleum industry, for instance the headquarters of Norwegian Offshore Directorate by Jan Ivar Aase (1985), and the Statoil headquarters at Forus by Einar Throne-Holst (1979).

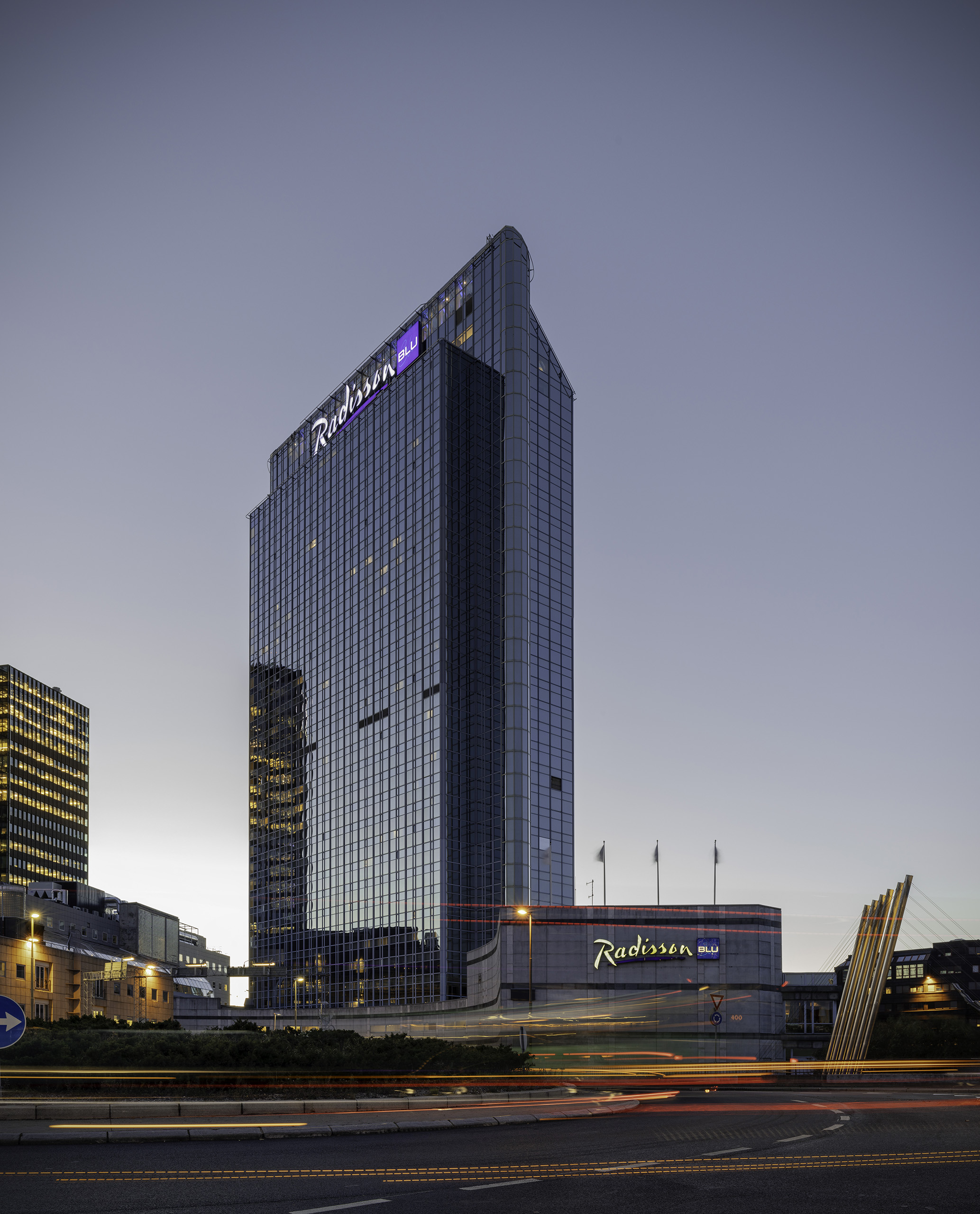
Oslo Plaza Hotel, Oslo, by White Arkitekter (1990)

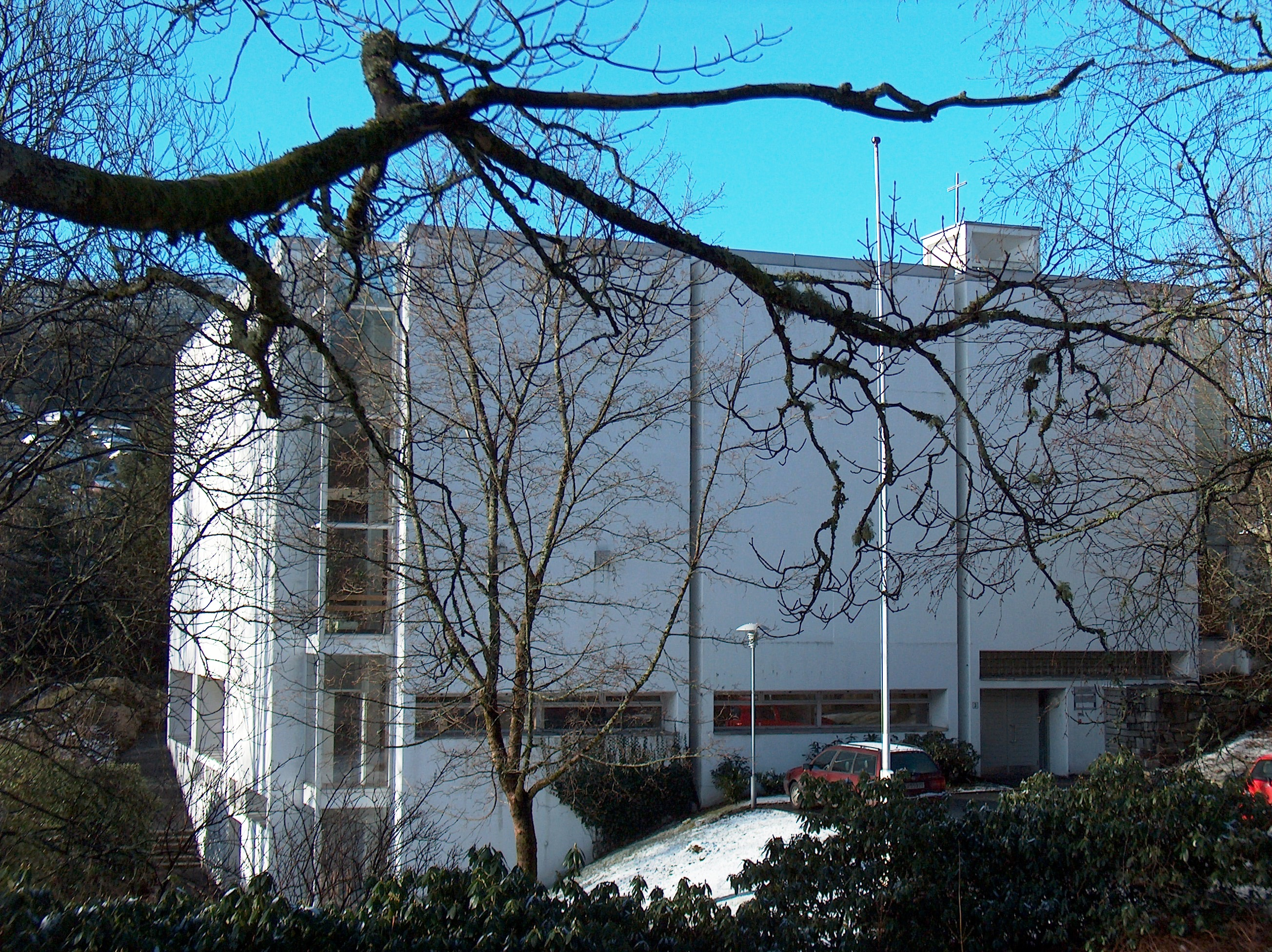
Eidsvåg Church, Bergen, by Nils Slaatto and Kjell Lund (1981)

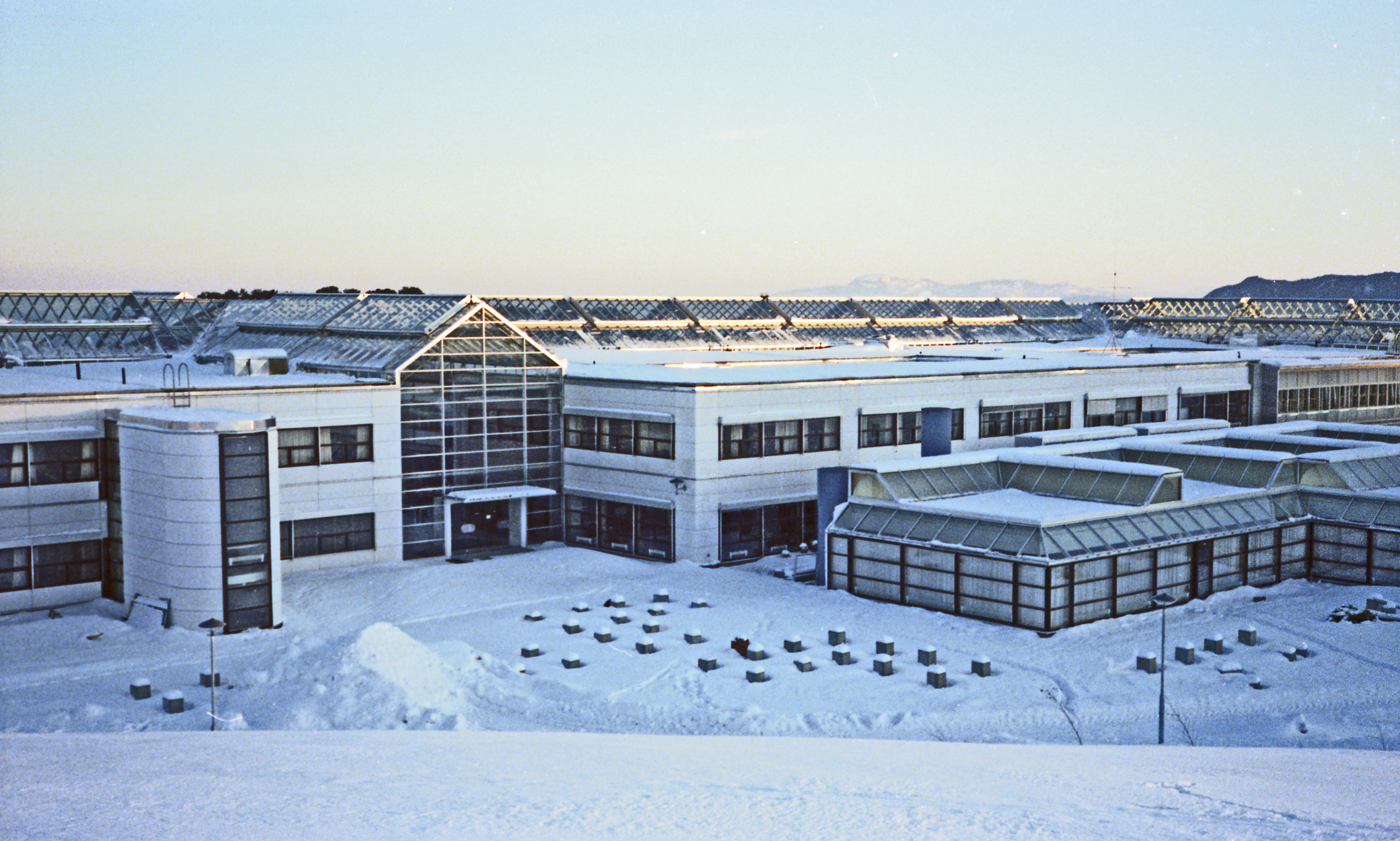
Dragvoll Campus of the Norwegian University of Science and Technology (NTNU), Trondheim, by Henning Larsen (1978)

Postmodern architecture in Norway was a brief interlude, but its influence prompted a reevaluation of the rigid modernism that dominated the post-war period, allowing for greater diversity in architecture during the 1990s. However, Norwegian architecture's strong emphasis on natural materials and a simple aesthetic contrasted with the more playful and symbolic expressions of international postmodernism. Therefore, Norwegian architecture from the late 1980s through the 1990s continued to be characterized by a shared commitment to the principles of a restrained modernism, focusing on the appropriate use of materials and rational, constructive solutions.

==== Government-sponsored architecture ====
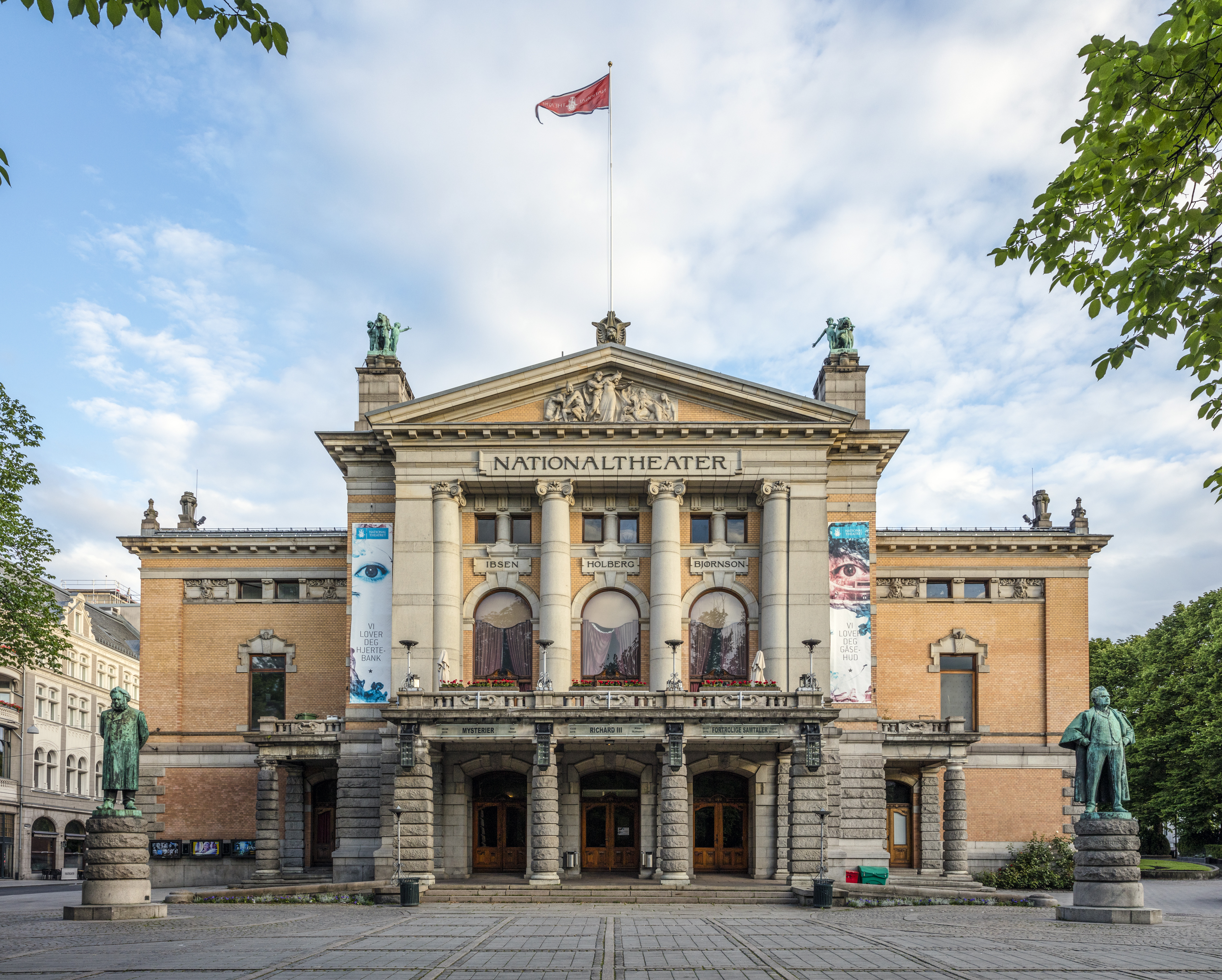
The National Theatre in Oslo

As Norway gained full independence in 1905, the national government determined to establish institutions consistent with the newly formed state's ambitions as a modern society. The first prime minister made it a priority to modernize the Royal Palace in Oslo, building among other things, some of the country's first water toilets, providing hot and cold water, and granting the Royal Family's wish of providing a common apartment for the king, queen, and their son.

In the early years, such public works were limited to structures needed for the national government's own administrative needs, but an increasing number of large-scale projects were conceived, designed, and completed since 1905 to meet various needs, such as:

- Public health and welfare, including:
  - Hospital complexes and polyclinical facilities, e.g., Rikshospitalet, Haukeland University Hospital, Gaustad Hospital,
  - Orphanages, later vacated in favor of other solutions that in turn required their own architecture.
  - Sanatoria, also vacated as the public health problem of tuberculosis was solved
  - Temporary and provisional housing for the indigent, asylum seekers, and homeless.
- Sports and recreation facilities. Social policy in Norway both at the national and local level has emphasized the connection between athletics at the mass and elite levels, and athletic centers have typically been built both to accommodate spectators, participants, and training. As an example, the Holmenkollen ski jump has been rebuilt several times, the Bislett Stadion was rebuilt in 2004–2005, and virtually every municipality has built year-round facilities.
- Centers for cultural expression. Some of the most ambitious and controversial structures have been those dedicated to performing arts, art museums, and any combination of such activities. Since a number of these have been built in cities with an architectural legacy, their designs have sought to complement the urban landscape by giving it a modern element. Examples include the Henie-Onstad Art Centre (by Jon Eikvar and Sven Erik Engebretsen), Chateau Neuf by Lund & Slaatto, the "barn" at Hedmarkmuseet by Sverre Fehn, and the Grieg Hall (by Knud Munk).
- Churches. The Norwegian State Church, holding the legacy of nearly one thousand years of Norwegian church architecture, commissioned new churches that covered a wide range of architectural styles, including entirely new designs (e.g. the Arctic Cathedral by Jan Inge Hovig) to new casts of traditional designs (e.g., Veldre Church, by Roar Jacobsen and Ulf Zettersten.)
- Transportation infrastructure, including bridges, tunnels, and most notably transit centers for rail, sea, and air transportation. Oslo airport (by the Aviaplan consortium at Gardermoen) was Norway's largest construction project ever.

The architectural designs of these projects have reflected not only the style currents of their time, but the societal debate over the purpose they were intended to serve. Nationalistic ambitions early on gave way to austere designs based on functionalism, and then to designs that emphasized human and ecological needs. To a great extent, Norwegian architects have found the opportunity to develop their signature styles through these projects, and thereby also a Norwegian architectural dialect.

Many of the projects have been controversial, and the resulting creative tension has probably served to advance the state of architectural arts in Norway. National and local governments and governmental institutions will continue to be among the largest customers of architects in coming years.

== Contemporary themes ==
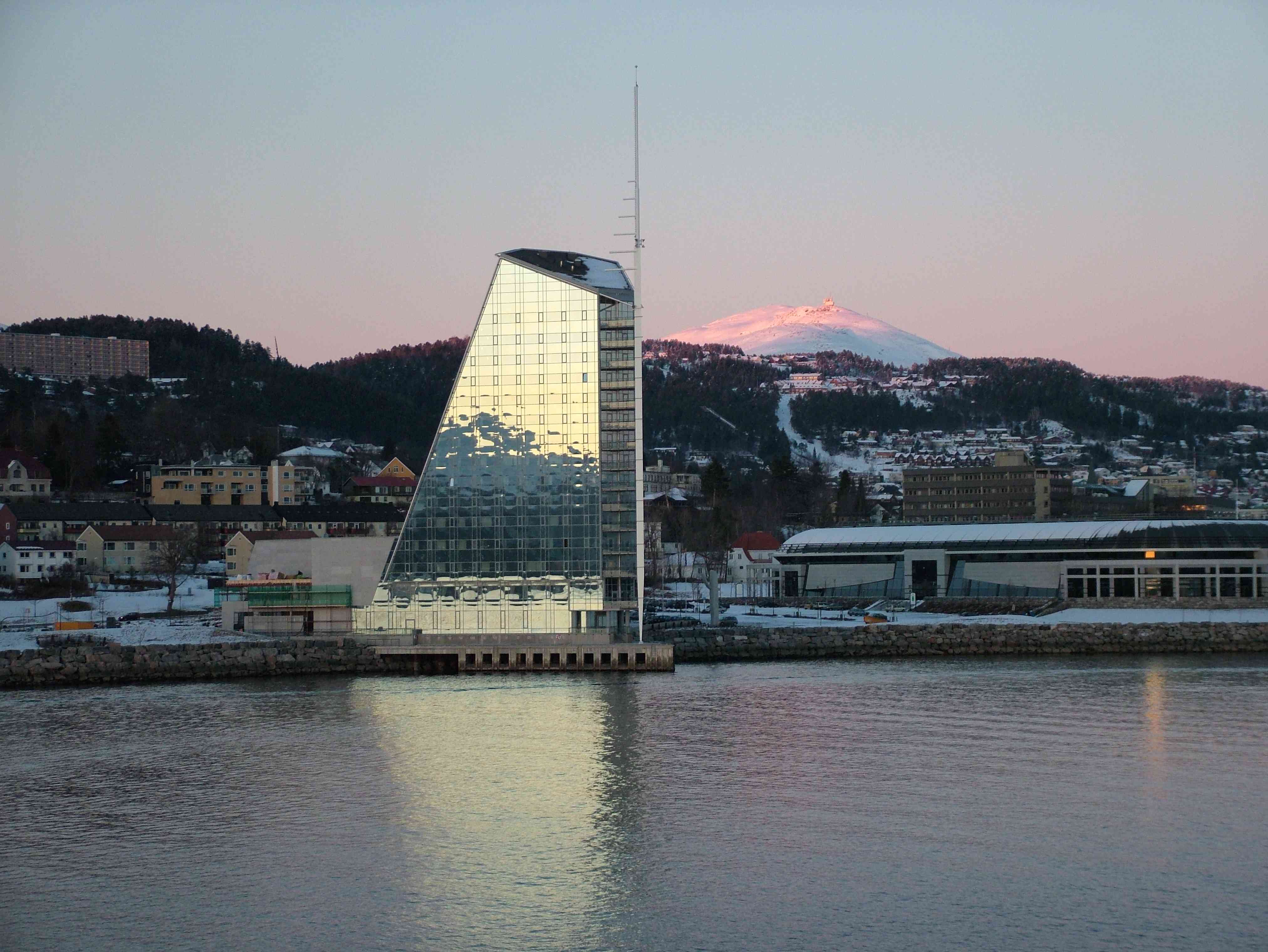
Rica Seilet Hotel in Molde

A number of trends influence contemporary architecture in Norway, among them:

- Growing public and private affluence. Buildings have a wider range of purpose, and are expected to meet increasingly complex demands. For example, the new opera building (designed by Snøhetta) in Oslo reflects an ambition not just to build a vibrant cultural center, but also to create a new architectural icon in the Oslofjord.
- Aesthetics as a factor of well-being. From the early austere principle that form should strictly follow function, there is a growing sensibility that aesthetics affect the physical and emotional health of those who use a building or structure. Norwegian laws concerning occupational health have for several decades emphasized access to daylight and fresh air, and it may also be that harsh climatic conditions create an added imperative for uplifting aesthetics.
- Environmental concerns. In addition to concerns about air and water pollution, Norwegian architectural design has also emphasized integration with the natural landscape. More recently, architects have also worked with engineers to make the most out of scarce resources, e.g., energy, water, etc.
- Demographic diversity. Norwegian demographics have undergone significant changes the last few decades, resulting in new religious buildings
- Norwegian building traditions. While it may be too much to speak of a renaissance in traditional Norwegian architecture, more and more urban planning is affected by the need to preserve or restore these traditions. Examples include plans to renew the center of Oppdal and recent work at the Oslo neighborhood of Grünerløkka.

A number of architectural prizes are awarded in Norway, including the Houen Foundation Award, Treprisen, Statens byggeskikkpris, Sundts premie, Betongelementprisen, Betongtavlen, Glassprisen, Murverksprisen, Stenprisen, and Stålkonstruksjonsprisen.

== See also ==
- Churches in Norway
- Norske arkitekters landsforbund

== References and notes ==
=== Books ===
- Gunnarsjaa, Arne (2006). Norges arkitekturhistorie (in Norwegian Bokmål). Oslo: Abstrakt. ISBN 978-82-7935-127-6.
- Grønvold, Ulf (2005). Hundre års nasjonsbygging - arkitektur og samfunn, 1905-2005 (in Norwegian). Oslo: Pax forlag. ISBN 82-530-2758-3.
- Brekke, Nils Georg; Per Jonas Nordhagen; Siri Skjold Lexau (2003). Norsk arkitekturhistorie - frå steinalder og bronsealder til 21. hundreåret (in Norwegian Nynorsk). Oslo: Det Norske Samlaget. ISBN 82-521-5748-3.
- Brochmann, Odd (1979). Bygget i Norge. En arkitekturhistorisk beretning (in Norwegian). Oslo: Gyldendal. ISBN 82-05-12328-4.
- Myhre, Bjørn; Stoklund, Bjarne; Gjærder, Per. Vestnordisk byggeskikk gjennom 2000 år. Tradisjon og forandring fra romertiden til 19. århundre (in Norwegian). Stavanger: AmS skrifter nummer 7.
- Sundt, Eilert (1862). Om bygningsskikken på landet i Norge.
- Norberg-Schulz, Christian (1986). Modern Norwegian Architecture. Oslo: Scandinavian University Press. ISBN 82-00-07696-2.
- Norberg-Schulz, Christian (1995). Stedskunst. Oslo: Gyldendal. ISBN 82-05-23502-3.
- Bruun, Ole Daniel (1999). Arkitektur i Oslo. Oslo: Kunnskapsforlaget. ISBN 978-82-573-0948-0.
