= Betongtavlen =

- Awarded for: A structure "where concrete is used in an environmentally, esthetically and technically excellent way"
- Country: Norway
- Presented by: National Associations of Norwegian Architects and the Norwegian Concrete Association
- First award: 1961

Betongtavlen (transl. The Concrete Tablet) is a Norwegian architecture and civil engineering award issued by the National Associations of Norwegian Architects and the Norwegian Concrete Association. The award is issues to a structure "where concrete is used in an environmentally, esthetically and technically excellent way". The award was first issued in 1961 for Bakkehaugen Church and has as of 2011 been awarded 53 times. The award is not necessarily awarded every year, and up to four structures have been awarded in a year. Structures awarded prices include office buildings, campus buildings, ski jumps, houses, hotels, bridges, tunnels, dams, oil platforms, industrial facilities, viewpoints and cultural institutions. Prizes are not necessarily awarded immediately after the structure was completed—for instance, Elgeseter Bridge was completed in 1951 but awarded the prize in 2006.

== List of awards ==
The following is a list of the awards, including the year it was awarded, the structure, the credited architects and engineering firms or people, the type of structure and the municipality in which it is located.

Betongtavlen winners
Image	Year	Structure	Architect	Type	Location
	1961	Bakkehaugen Church	Erling Viksjø	Church	Oslo Municipality
—	1962	Storage facility for cars	Jarle Berg	Industrial facility	Oslo Municipality
	1963	Tromsø Bridge	Erling Viksjø	Bridge	Tromsø Municipality
	1964	Asker Town Hall	Lund & Slaatto	Office building	Asker Municipality
	1965	Havnelageret	Bredo Henrik Berntsen	Office building	Oslo Municipality
	1965	Indekshuset	John Engh	Office building	Oslo Municipality
—	1966	Vekterkvarteret	Peter Andreas Munch Mellbye	Office building	Moss Municipality
	1976	Romsås Station	Håkon Mjelva	Metro station	Oslo Municipality
—	1976	Hedmark Museum	Sverre Fehn	Museum	Hamar Municipality
	1976	Zakarias Dam	—	Dam	Fjord Municipality
	1976	Condeep	—	Oil platform	North Sea
	1977	Det Norske Veritas Headquarters	John Engh	Office building	Oslo Municipality
	1978	Grieghallen	Lund & Slaatto	Concert venue	Bergen Municipality
	1980	Bryggens Museum	Øivind Maurseth	Museum	Bergen Municipality
	1981	Dragvoll (University of Trondheim)	Henning Larsen	Campus	Bergen Municipality
—	1981	Furuset Bridges	F.R. Haugli	Bridge	Oslo Municipality
	1985	Snarøya Church	Hille Melbye Arkitekter	Church	Bærum Municipality
	1985	Saltstraumen Bridge	Hindhamar Sundt Thomassen / Aas-Jakobsen	Bridge	Bodø Municipality
	1985	Royal Garden Hotel	CFKL Arkitektgruppe	Hotel	Trondheim Municipality
	1985	Grønland Police Station	Telje-Torp-Aasen	Police Headquarters/ Office building	Grønland, Oslo Municipality
—	1986	Kaffehuset Friele	Jørgen Djuurhus / Erik Fersum	Industrial facility	Bergen Municipality
	1986	Det Norske Teatret	Arkitektkontoret 4B	Industrial facility	Oslo Municipality
	1987	Kreditkassen Headquarters	Lund & Slaatto / Østbye-Kleven-Almaas-Wike	Office building	Oslo Municipality
—	1988	Torgeir Norheim's House	Torgeir Norheim	House	Stavanger Municipality
	1988	Sølvberget	Lund & Slaatto	Cultural center	Stavanger Municipality
—	1989	St. Magnus Church	Lund & Slaatto	Church	Lillestrøm Municipality
	1989	Førrevass Dam	Chr. F. Grøner	Dam	Suldal Municipality / Hjelmeland Municipality
—	1991	E18 Stavanger	Telje-Torp-Aasen / Østbye-Kleven-Almaas-Wike / Ovrums Arkitektkontor / Grindaker, Lunde, Orre og Fluksrud	Road	Stavanger Municipality
—	1991	Elmholtveien 6	Narud-Stokke-Wiig	House	Oslo Municipality
	1992	Skarnsund Bridge	Johannes Holt	Bridge	Inderøy Municipality
	1992	Norwegian Glacier Museum	Sverre Fehn	Museum	Sogndal Municipality
	1993	Lysgårdsbakken	ØKAW Arkitekter	Ski jump	Lillehammer Municipality
—	1994	Engervannet Bridge	Knutsen & Lundevall / Arne Henriksen / Aas-Jakobsen	Bridge	Bærum Municipality
	1995	Troll A	Norwegian Contractors / Dr.techn.Olav Olsen / Grøner / Multiconsult	Oil platform	North Sea
	1996	Grenland Bridge	Lund & Slaatto / Lunde & Løvseth / Hindhamar Sundt Thomassen	Bridge	Bamble Municipality / Porsgrunn Municipality
	1997	Oslo Airport, Gardermoen Control Tower	Aviaplan	Control tower	Ullensaker Municipality
—	1998	Rena Leir	LPO Arkitekter	Military base	Åmot Municipality
	1999	Hølendalen Bridges	Lunde & Løvseth / Johannes Holt	Bridge	Vestby Municipality
	2000	Science Building	Narud-Stokke-Wiig / Hus Sivilarkitekter	Campus	Trondheim Municipality
	2000	Ivar Aasen-tunet	Sverre Fehn / Hus Sivilarkitekter	Museum	Ørsta Municipality
	2001	Telenor Center	Pedersen/Ege Arkitekter / Einar Tønseth	Office building	Bergen Municipality
—	2002	Villa Berg Nåvik	Dahle/Dahle Arkitekter	House	Asker Municipality
	2002	Norges Varemesse	Arne Henriksen Arkitekter / Bystrup Architecture Design Engineering	Exhibition center	Lillestrøm Municipality
—	2003	Villa Bakke	MMW arkitekter	House	Bærum Municipality
	2004	Vardåsen Church	Terje Grønmo	Church	Asker Municipality
	2004	Elgeseter Bridge	Gudolf Blakstad / Herman Munthe-Kaas	Bridge	Trondheim Municipality
	2006	Svinesund Bridge	Lund & Slaatto / Sundt og Thomassen / Aas-Jakobsen	Bridge	Halden Municipality
	2007	Sohlbergplassen	Carl-Viggo Hølmebakk	Viewpoint	Stor-Elvdal Municipality
	2008	Gyldendal Headquarters	Sverre Fehn	Office building	Oslo Municipality
	2009	Norwegian Museum of Architecture	Sverre Fehn	Museum	Oslo Municipality
	2010	Union of Education Norway Headquarters	Element Arkitekter	Office building	Oslo Municipality
	2011	Bjørvika Tunnel	Norwegian Public Roads Administration	Tunnel	Oslo Municipality
—	2011	Midtåsen Sculpture Park	Lund Hagem Arkitekter	Museum	Sandefjord Municipality
—	2012	National Tourist Route Trollstigen	Reiulf Ramstad Arkitekter	Visitor Centre and Viewpoint	Rauma Municipality
—	2013	National Tourist Route Havøysund	Reiulf Ramstad Arkitekter	Rest area	Måsøy Municipality

== See also ==
- List of engineering awards
