= Johan Nygaardsvolds plass =

Square in Oslo, Norway

Coordinates: 59°54′55″N 10°44′40″E

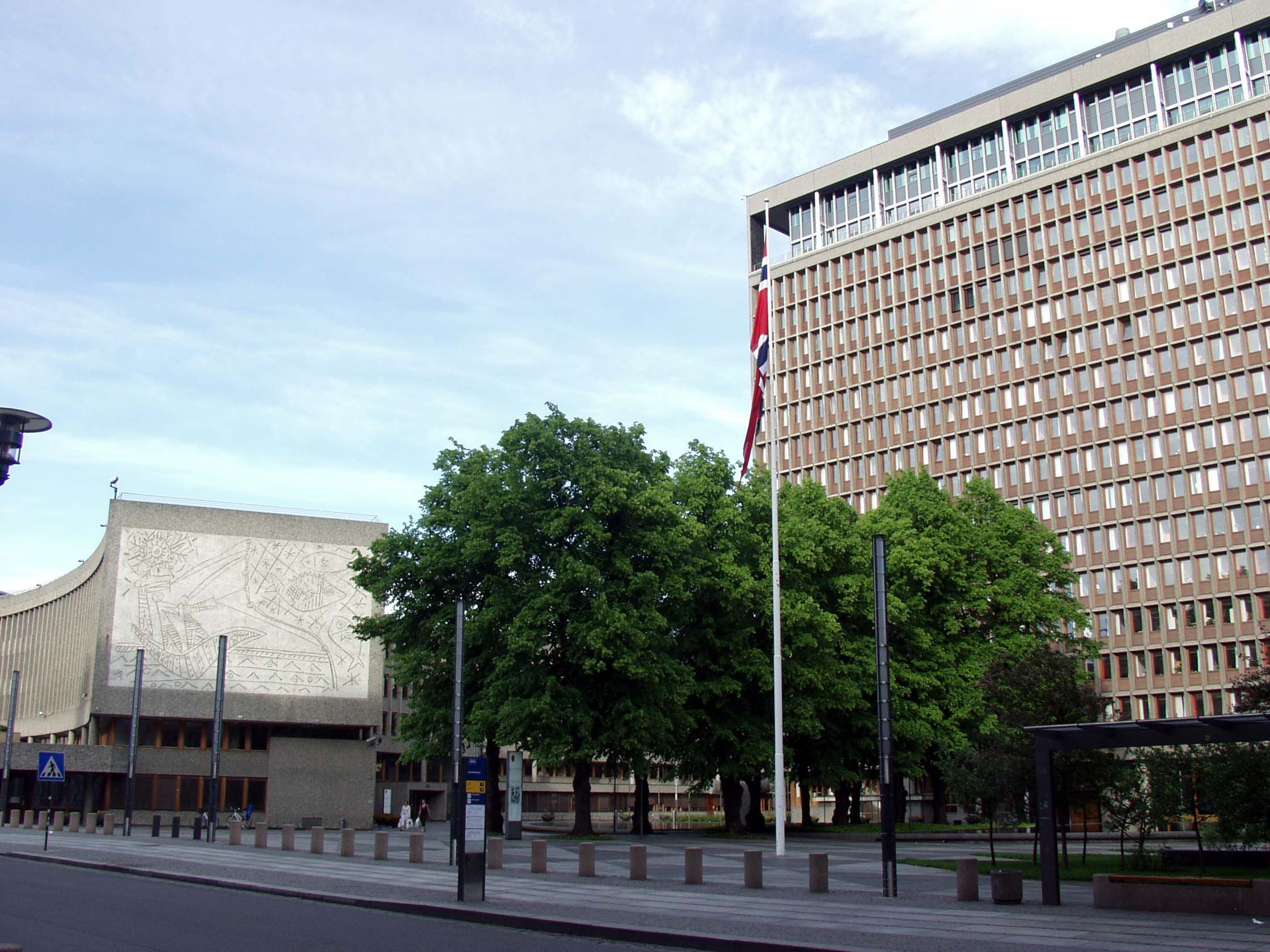
Architect Erling Viksjøs government building on Johan Nygaardsvolds plass

Johan Nygaardsvolds plass is a town square in Oslo, Norway.

It is located between the offices of the Ministry of Finance, Høyblokka ("High Block"), and Y Block in Regjeringskvartalet. The square encompasses the Regjeringsparken ("The Government Park") with a water feature and an allée of trees. The square and park were designed by architect firm of Lunde & Løvseth.

The square is named after Prime Minister Johan Nygaardsvold (1879-1952) who was Prime Minister in Norway from 20 March 1935 to 25 June 1945 as the leader of Nygaardsvold's Cabinet.

No buildings have an address on this square.
