= Einar Gerhardsens plass =

Square in Oslo, Norway

Coordinates: 59°54′54.89″N 10°44′48.12″E

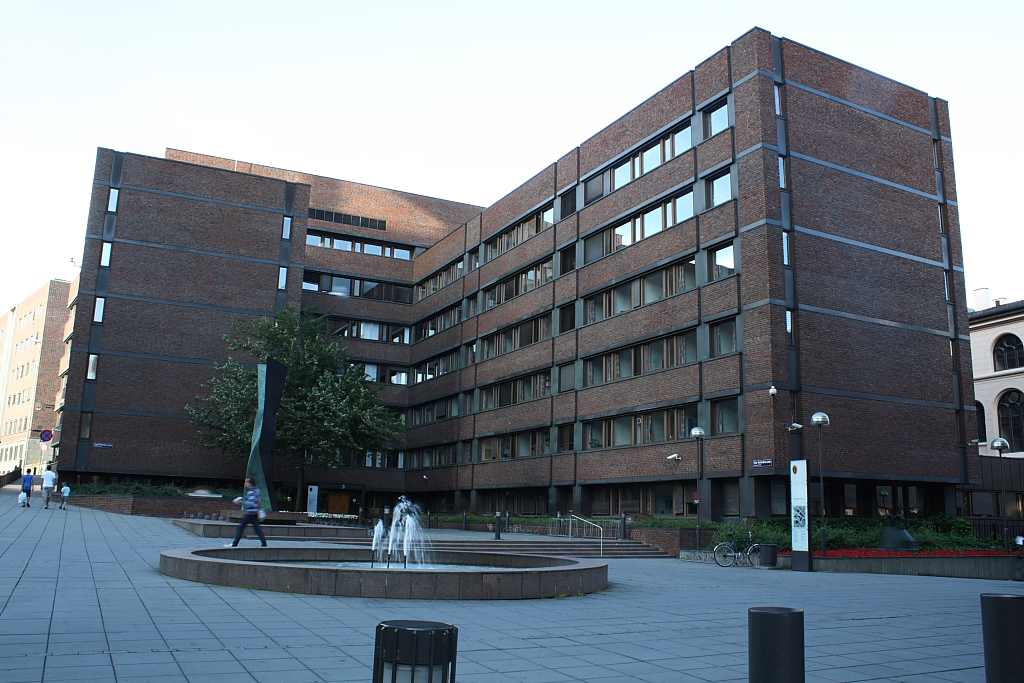
Einar Gerhardsens plass in Oslo

Einar Gerhardsens plass is a town square between the three government buildings S Block, R4, and Høyblokka in Regjeringskvartalet in Oslo. The street Grubbegata passes through the square.

The square was named in 1997 after Prime Minister Einar Gerhardsen.

On 22 July 2011, the buildings were heavily damaged when a car bomb exploded outside the nearby Office of the Prime Minister building.

== Images ==
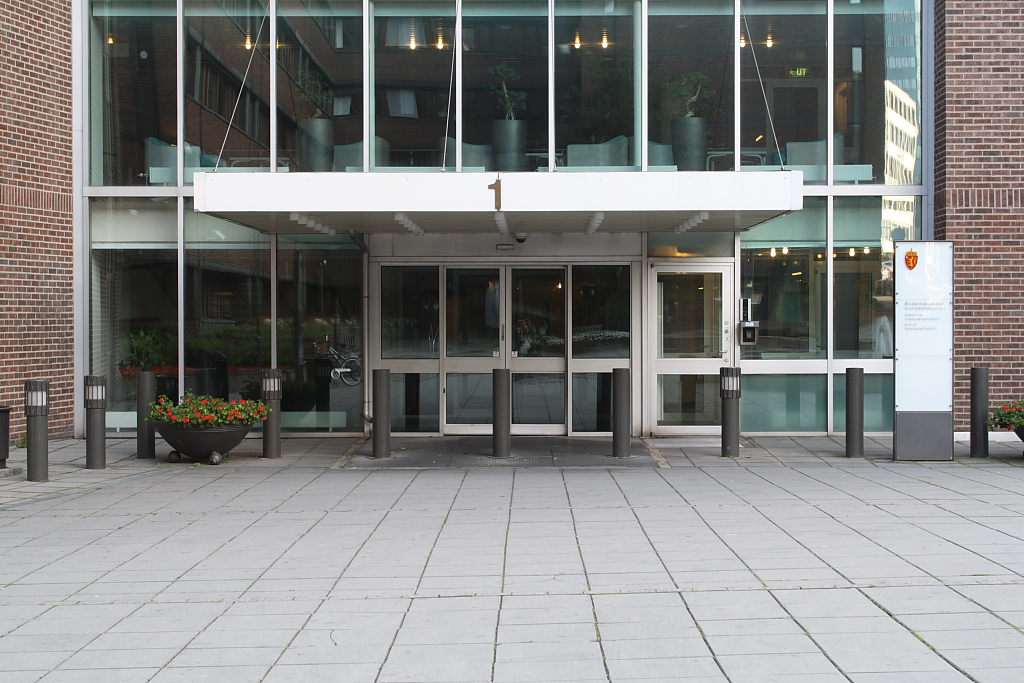
Closeup of the entrance to Einar Gerhardsens plass 1

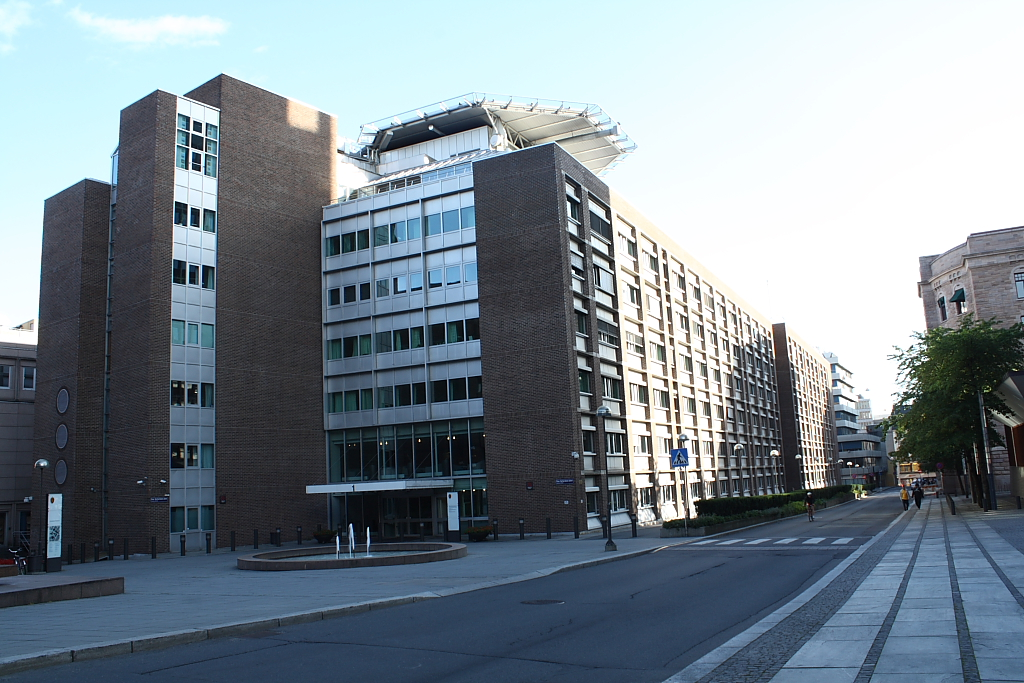
Einar Gerhardsens plass 1, housing the Ministry of Petroleum and Energy and the Ministry of Trade and Industry

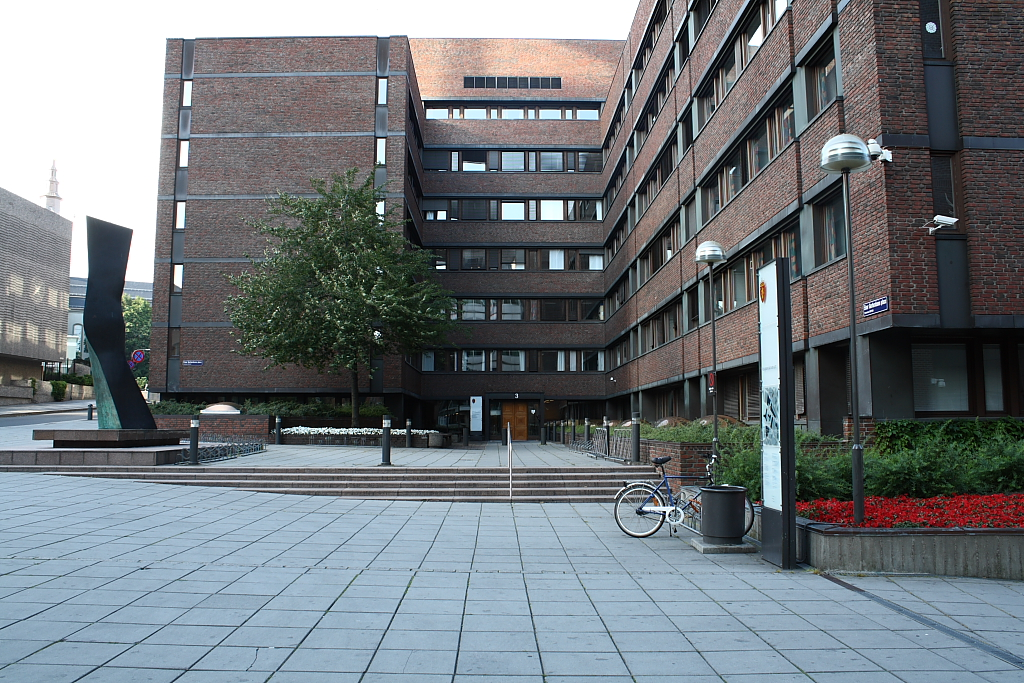
Einar Gerhardsens plass 3, housing the Ministry of Labour and Social Inclusion and the Ministry of Health and Care Services (Norway)
