= Bakkehaugen Church =

- Bakkehaugen kirke
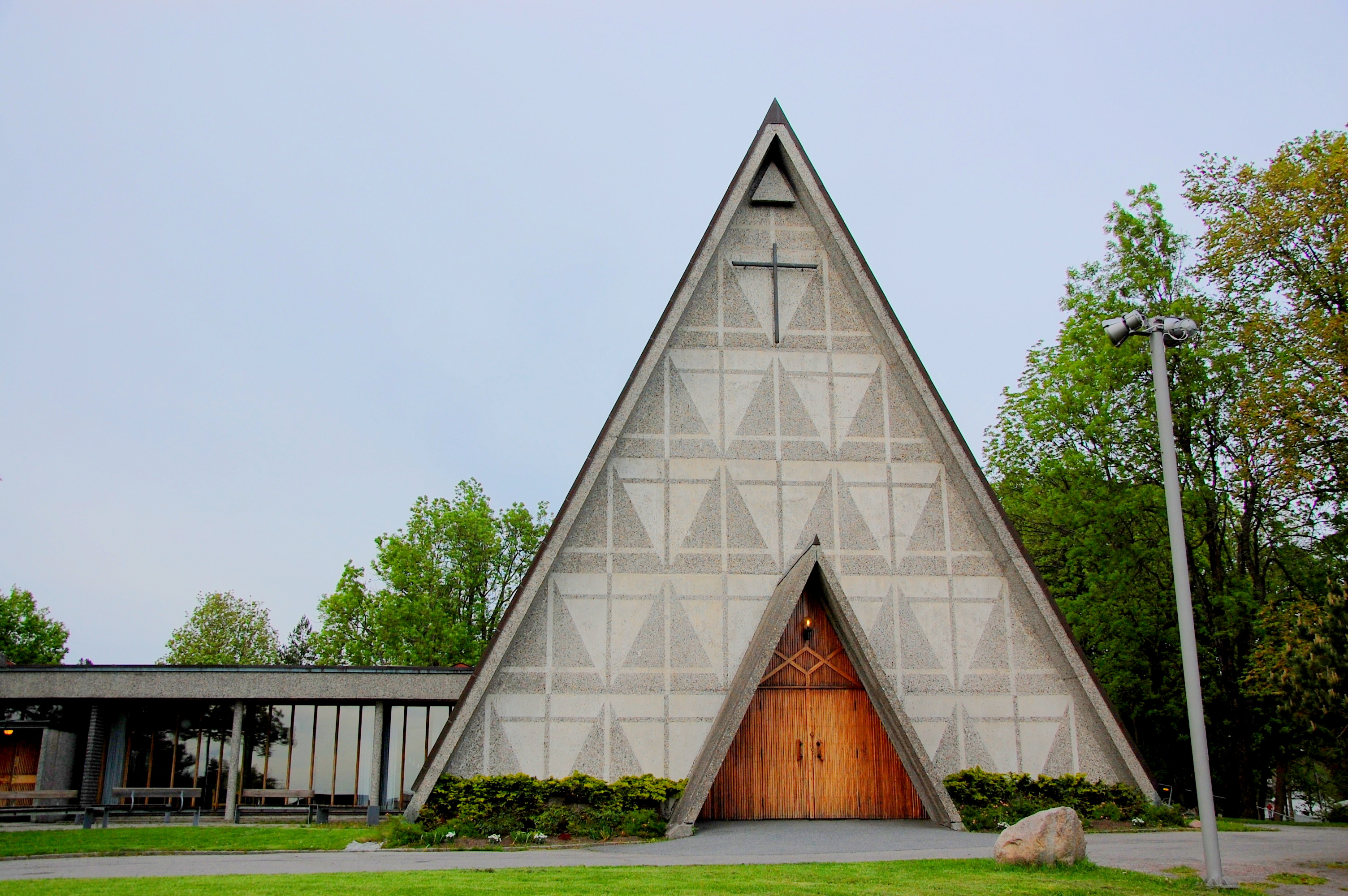

- Location within Oslo Location within Norway
- 59°56′56.065″N 10°45′14.962″E
- Location: Carl Grøndahls vei 27, Oslo,
- Country: Norway
- Denomination: Church of Norway
- Churchmanship: Evangelical Lutheran
- Website: kirken.no/bmv

History
- Status: Parish church
- Consecrated: 1959

Architecture
- Functional status: Active
- Architect(s): Ove Bang; Erling Viksjø

Specifications
- Capacity: 320 seats
- Materials: Concrete

Administration
- Diocese: Diocese of Oslo
- Parish: Bakkehaugen, Majorstuen og Vestre Aker

Bakkehaugen Church is a church, located in the neighborhood of Tåsen in Oslo, Norway.

In 1938, an architectural competition was announced. This was won by architect Ove Bang. The construction of the church was delayed due to World War II and lack of funding. The winning draft was reworked by architect Erling Viksjø before his death in 1942. The construction of the church started in the late 1950s. The church was consecrated by bishop Johannes Smemo on December 20, 1959.

The church building has been awarded the architectural prize Betongtavlen for outstanding construction in concrete. The building is a typical representative of its time.

The church is built in natural concrete and has a boathouse shape (Triangle). It has a freestanding bell tower. The facility also houses offices and parish halls. The church was somewhat expanded in 1994, and the church gained new copper roofs in 1999.

The decorations in the church room are done by Kai Fjell og Carl Nesjar.

The church is listed by the Norwegian Directorate for Cultural Heritage and protected by Norwegian law.
