= Prime Minister of Norway =

Head of government

Prime Minister of the Kingdom of Norway
- Norges statsminister (Bokmål); Noregs statsminister (Nynorsk)
- State coat of arms of Norway

- State flag of Norway

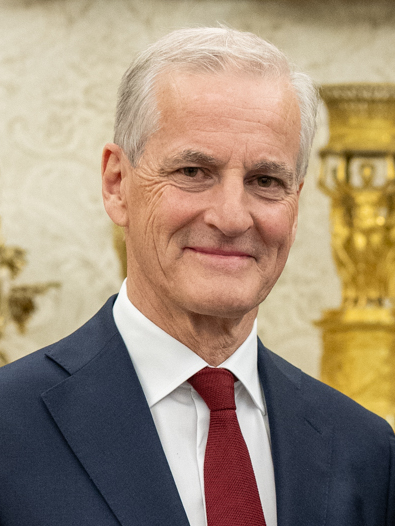
- Incumbent; Jonas Gahr Støre since 14 October 2021
- Executive branch of the Norwegian Government; Office of the Prime Minister
- Style: None (in Norway); His/Her Excellency (outside Norway)
- Type: Head of government
- Member of: Council of State
- Reports to: Monarch; Storting
- Residence: Inkognitogata 18
- Seat: Regjeringskvartalet, Oslo
- Nominator: The outgoing prime minister or the president of the Storting
- Appointer: The Monarch
- Term length: 4 years; renewable; Based on majority support in the Storting
- Constituting instrument: Constitution of Norway
- Inaugural holder: Peder Anker
- Formation: 17 May 1814
- Deputy: No fixed position, often the longest serving member of the current cabinet (currently: Jon-Ivar Nygård)
- Salary: annual: 1,735,682 NOK/US$ 168,023
- Website: Prime Minister's Office

The prime minister of Norway (Norwegian: statsminister, which directly translates to "minister of state") is the head of government and chief executive of Norway. The prime minister and Cabinet (consisting of all the most senior government department heads) are collectively accountable for their policies and actions to the monarch, to the Storting (Parliament of Norway), to their political party, and ultimately the electorate. In practice, since it is nearly impossible for a government to stay in office against the will of the Storting, the prime minister is primarily answerable to the Storting. The prime minister is almost always the leader of the majority party in the Storting or the leader of the senior partner in the governing coalition.

Norway has a constitution, which was adopted on 17 May 1814. The position of prime minister is the result of legislation. Modern prime ministers have few statutory powers, but provided they can command the support of their parliamentary party. Prime ministers control both the legislature and the executive (the cabinet) and hence wield considerable de facto powers. As of 2021 the prime minister of Norway is Jonas Gahr Støre, of the Labour Party, replacing Erna Solberg of the Conservative Party, who resigned in October 2021.

Unlike their counterparts in the rest of Europe, Norwegian prime ministers do not have the option of advising the king to dissolve the Storting and call a snap election. The constitution requires that the Storting serve out its full four-year term. If the prime minister loses the Storting's confidence, they must resign.

== See also ==
- List of heads of government of Norway
- Regjeringskvartalet
