= Inkognitogata 18 =

Residence of prime minister of Norway

Coordinates: 59°55′5″N 10°43′25″E

Prime minister's residence or Inkognitogata 18 (Norwegian: Statsministerboligen)
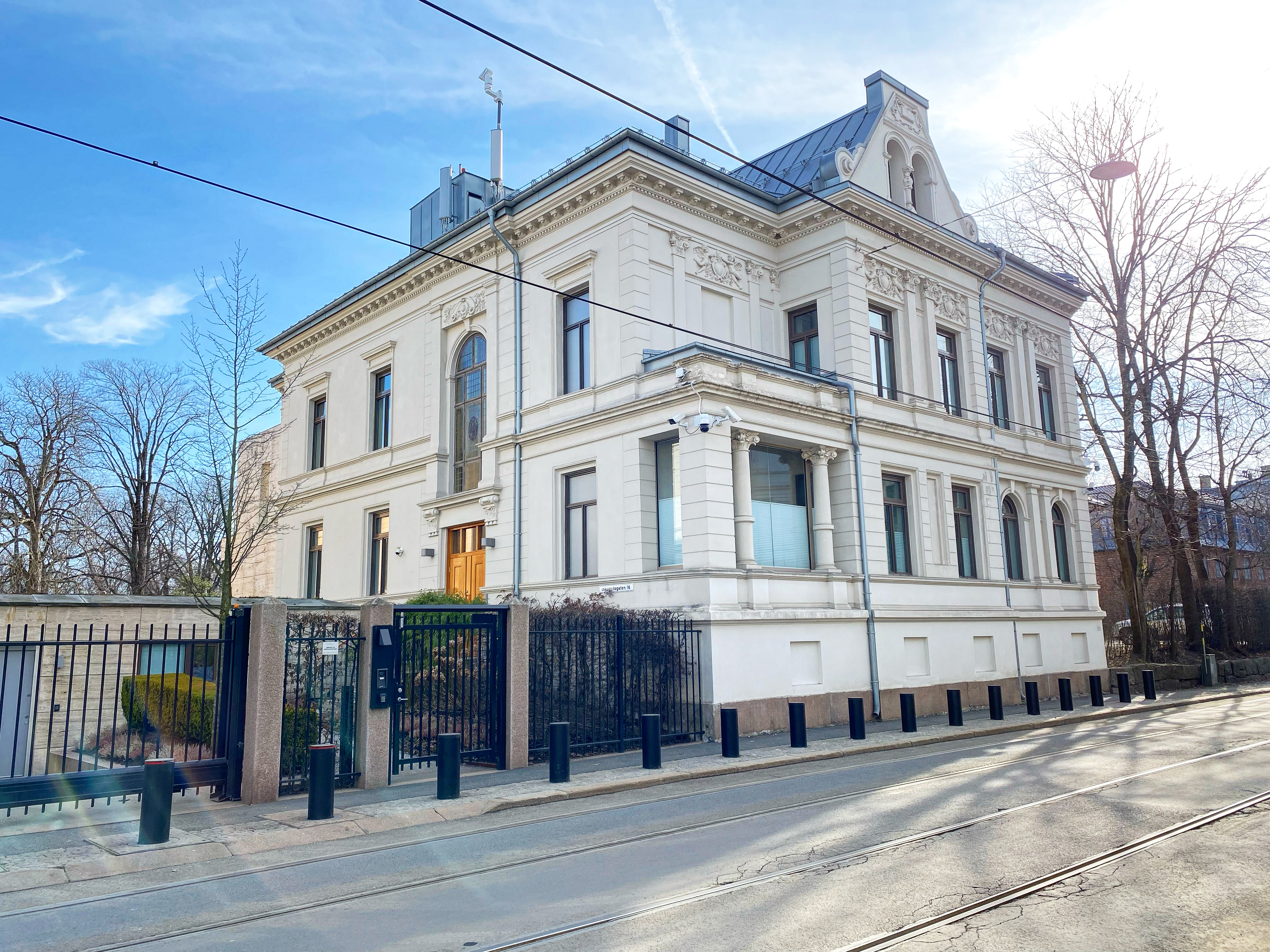
- Inkognitogata 18
- Interactive map of the Prime minister's residence or Inkognitogata 18 (Norwegian: Statsministerboligen) area

General information
- Location: Oslo, Norway
- Construction started: 1996
- Completed: 2008
- Cost: 315 million Norwegian kroner
- Client: Norwegian government

Design and construction
- Architects: Riseng & Kiehl AS Arkitekter
- Engineer: Statsbygg

Parkveien 45 or 'Villa Parafina'
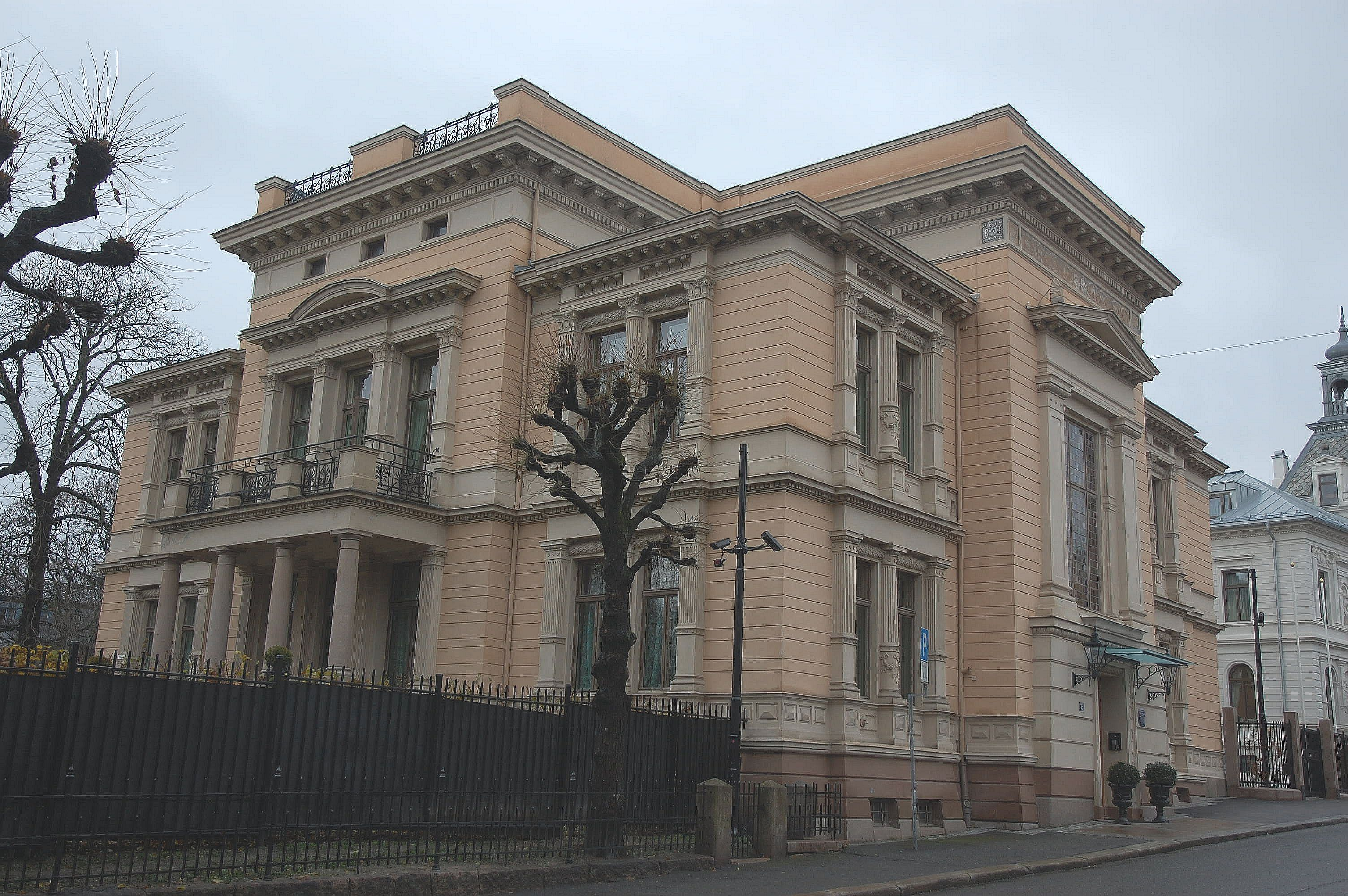
- Interactive map of the Parkveien 45 or 'Villa Parafina' area

General information
- Architectural style: Italian classical revival
- Location: Parkveien 45, Oslo, Norway
- Completed: 1877
- Client: Fredrik Sundt

Design and construction
- Architect: Henrik Nissen

Inkognitogata 18 is the official residence of the Prime Minister of Norway. It is located in Oslo, the capital of Norway. The residence was completed in 2008 and is a complex of new and old buildings. It includes the original buildings on Parkveien 45, Inkognitogata 18, Riddervolds gate 2, which have been connected with new structures, and the gardens of Parkveien 45 to 47.

The prime minister's private residence is in Inkognitogata 18 while the official residence and government representation rooms are in both Parkveien 45 and Inkognitogata 18. Riddervolds gate 2 is the official residence for visiting foreign dignitaries. The complex totals an area of 3030 m^{2}. Inkognitogata 18 has an area of 670 m^{2} with the private rooms consisting of 400 m^{2}.

The project was led by Statsbygg, and the architects for the new buildings were Riseng & Kiehl AS Arkitekter while Snøhetta designed the garden. The project had a total price of 315 million Norwegian kroner.

== Residences of the prime minister ==
Norway has had several residences for its state leader through the years but did not have an official residence for the prime minister until the current residence was completed. Parkveien 45 is considered the first and original prime ministers residence in Norway while Arne Konsmos' Villa Stenersen in Tuengen allé 10c also served as the prime minister's residence for some time. The last prime minister to have lived in a residence prior to the completion of Inkognitogata 18 was Odvar Nordli, who lived in Villa Stenersen, but he moved out before his term ended and turned the residence over to Minister of Trade Hallvard Bakke. Nordli believed that Bakke, who lived in a small apartment with his wife and two children, needed the space more than Nordli and his wife did.

In 2004, Prime Minister Kjell Magne Bondevik proposed that a proper residence be constructed for both practical and safety reasons. These plans were followed and Jens Stoltenberg became the first prime minister to reside in the building when the expansion and restoration was completed in 2008.

== Prime ministers who have resided in Inkognitogata 18 ==
- Jens Stoltenberg (2008–2013)
- Erna Solberg (2013–2021)
- Jonas Gahr Støre (2021–present)

== Individual buildings ==
=== Parkveien 45 ===
Parkveien 45 used to be the official residence of the prime minister of Norway, but had not been used as such for many years.

The house in Parkveien 45 was originally built as a private residence for Fredrik Sundt, a businessman importing paraffin oil, hence the popular name of the house 'Villa Parafina'. The villa was purchased by the Norwegian government in 1896. From 1898 to 1908 it was used as the residence for the prime minister of Norway, housing Francis Hagerup, Johannes Steen, Otto Blehr, Christian Michelsen and Jørgen Løvland in succession. From 1908 the house was the residence of the foreign minister until 1961 when it became the government representation house. The house is important in the history of Norway's independence negotiations with Sweden in 1905.

=== Historic and former residences ===
- Stiftsgården in Rådhusgaten 13 (1873–1896)
- Villa Parafina (1896-1908, 1924-1931 and 1933-1935)
- Victoria Terrasse 1 (1912–1920)
- Borgenveien 12 (1965–1971)
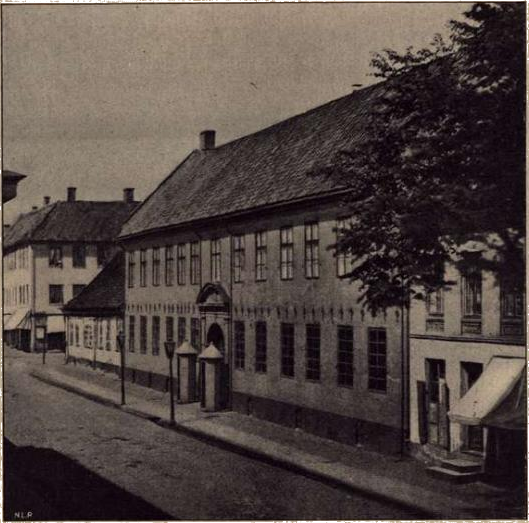
The Stiftsgården building, used as a residence between 1873 and 1896

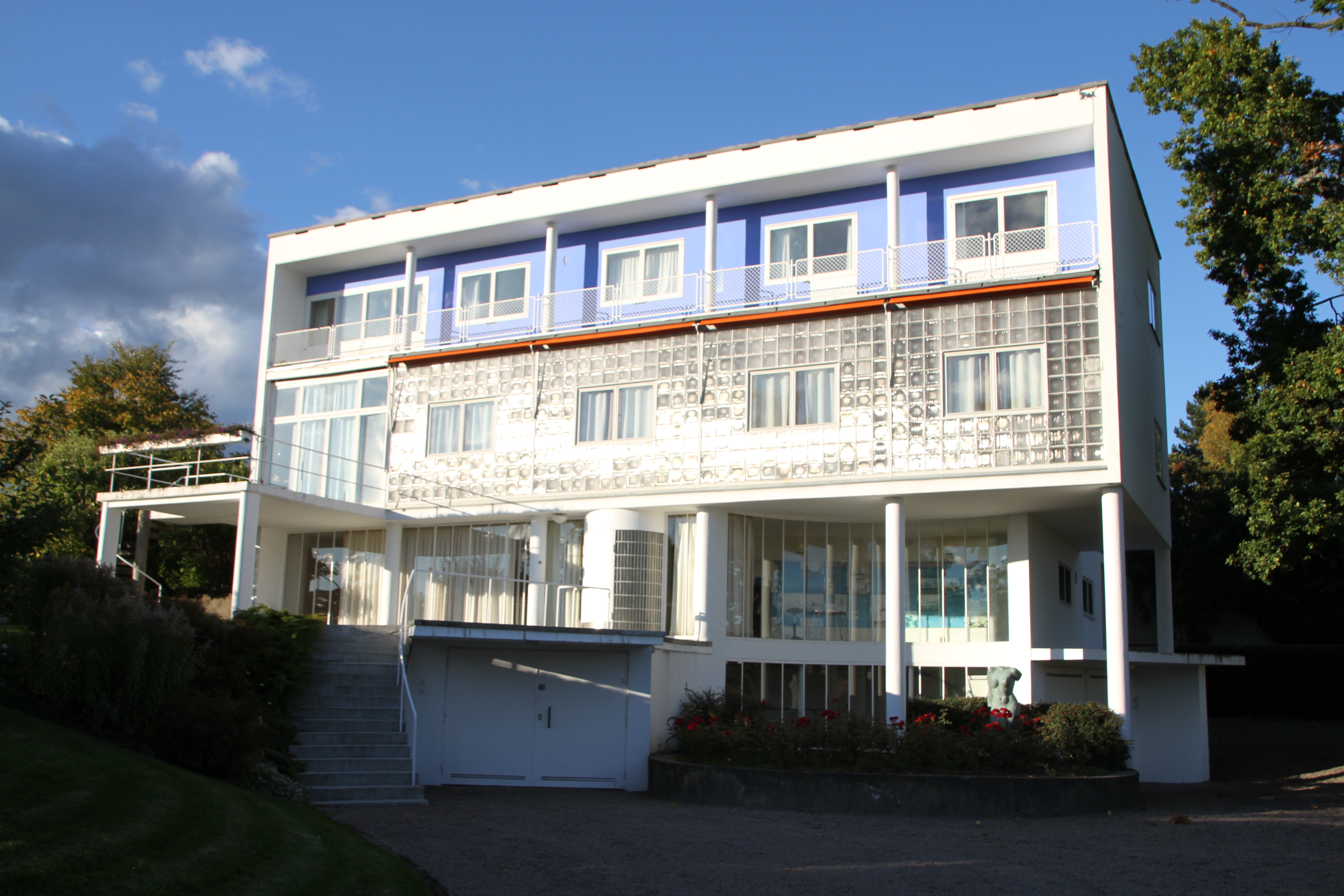
Villa Stenersen which was used as a residence in the 1970s

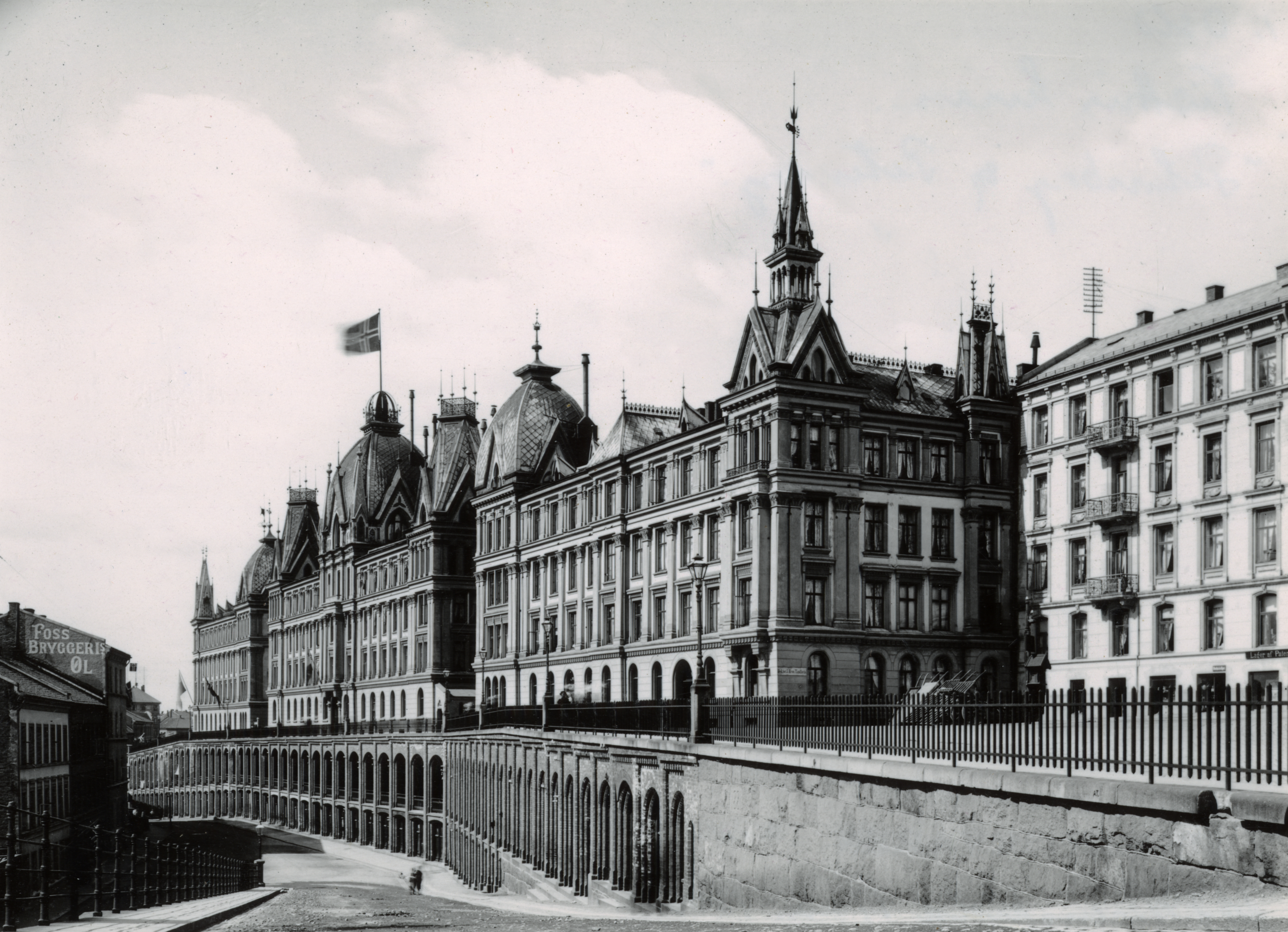
Victoria Terrasse

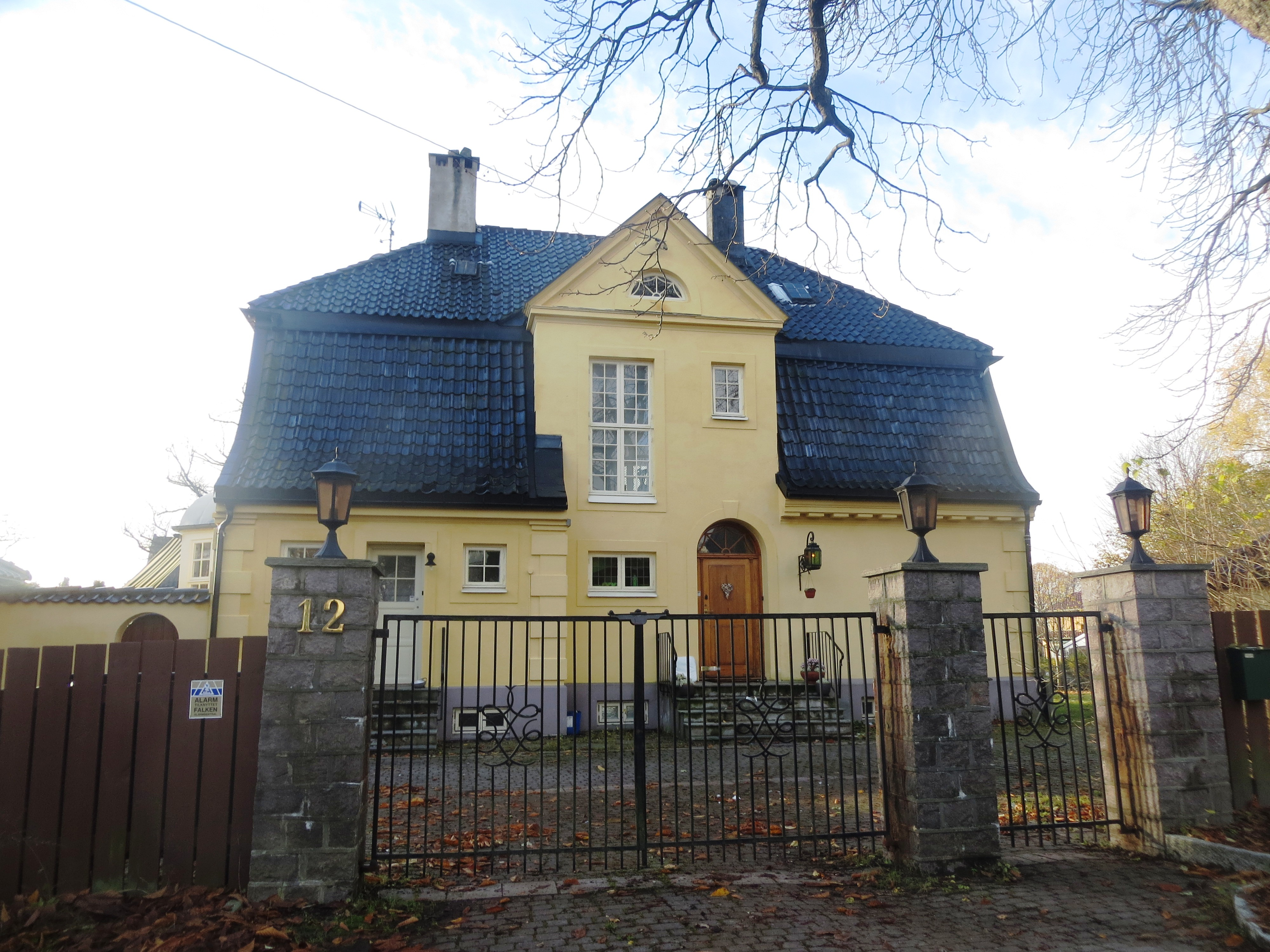
Borgenveien 12

== See also ==
- Government of Norway
- List of Norwegian Prime Ministers
