= Y-Block =

Building in Oslo, Norway

Coordinates: 59.9160°N 10.7458°E

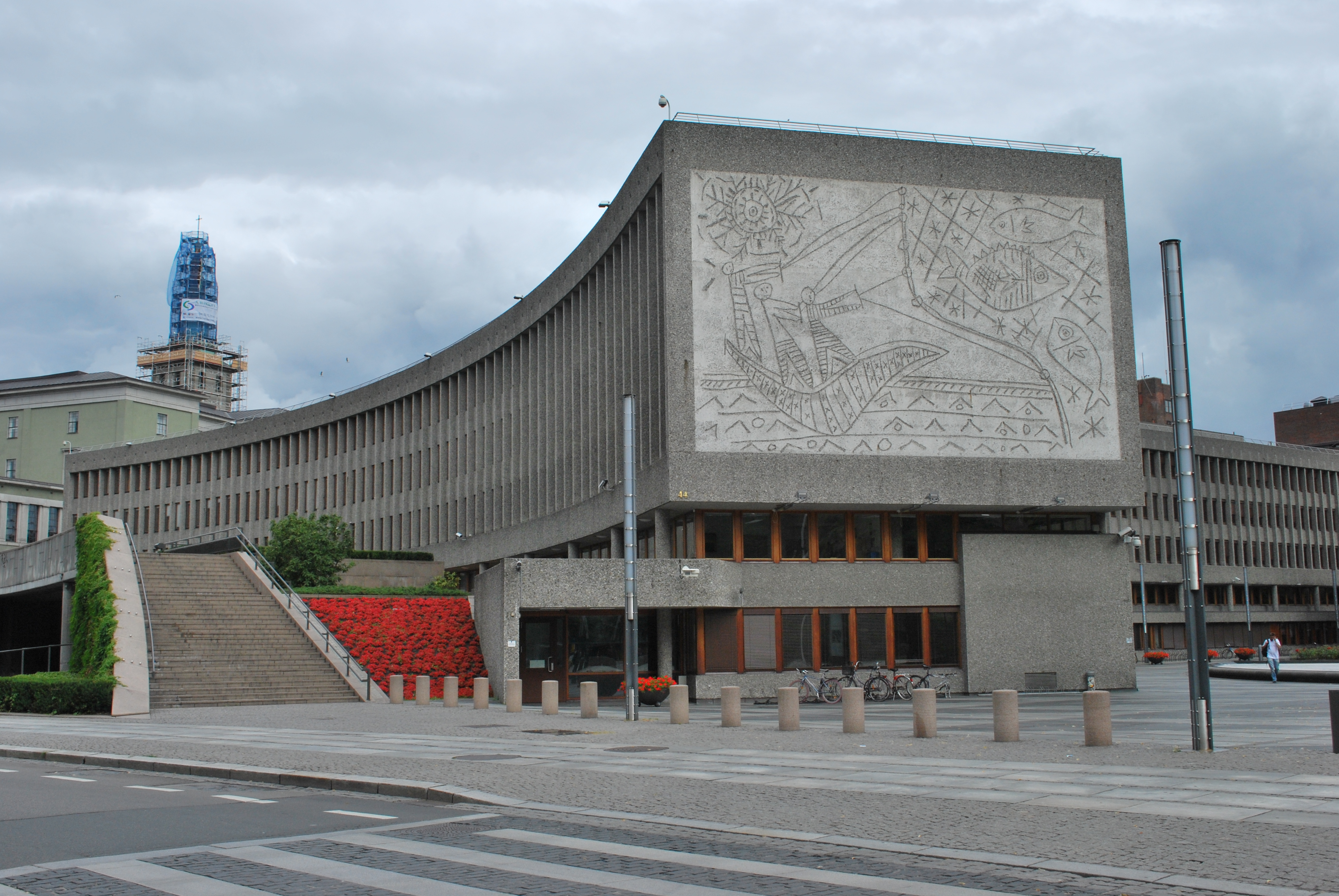
The Y-Block, 2008

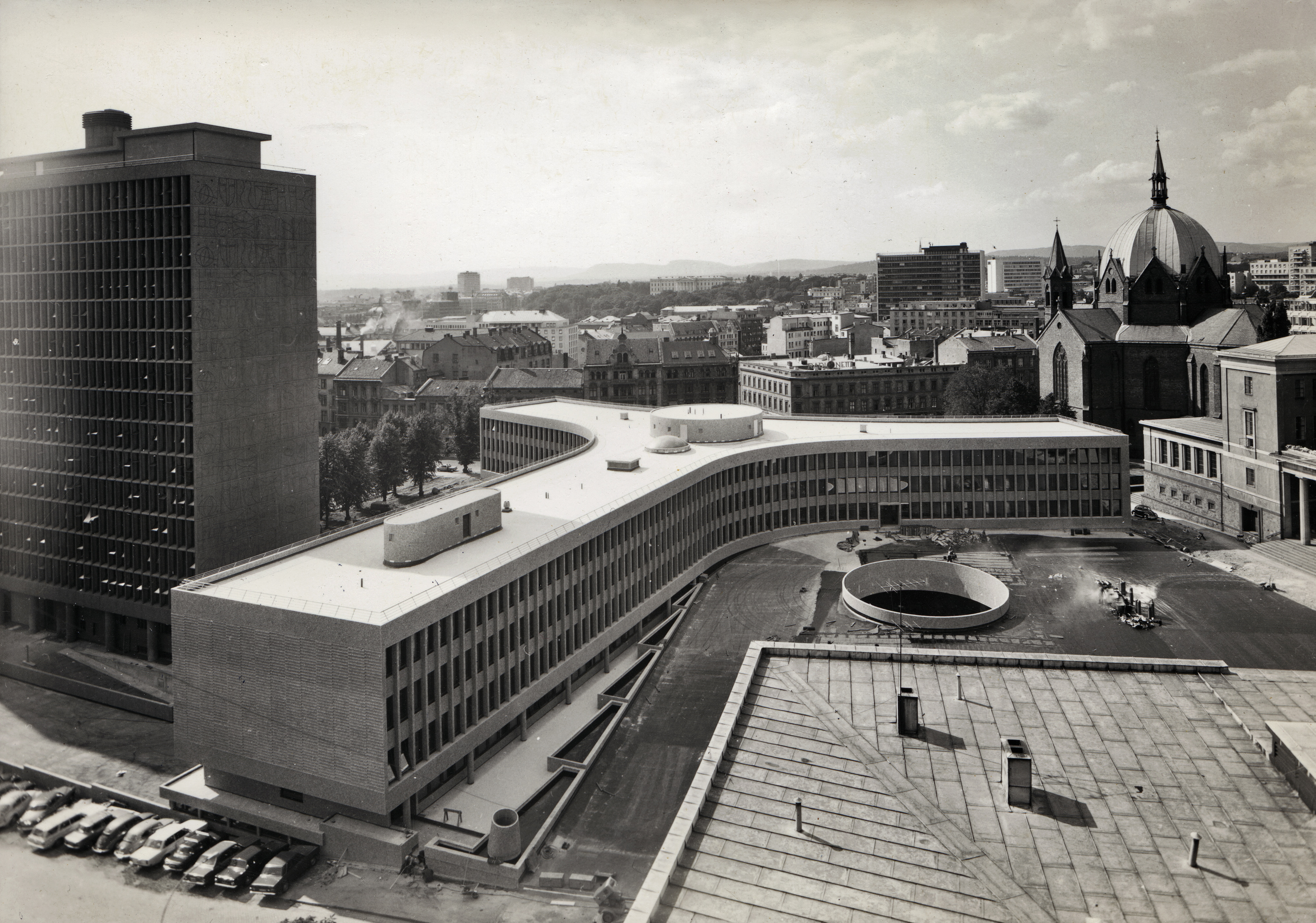
The building in 1969

The Y-Block was a building in Oslo, Norway, extant from 1970 to 2020. The building, designed in a Brutalist style by Erling Viksjø, was part of the Regjeringskvartalet (Government Quarter) in the centre of the city. It featured two murals by Pablo Picasso. It was one of few sites with murals designed by Picasso, along with the Château de Castille in France and the Col·legi d'Arquitectes de Catalunya in Barcelona.

The building was damaged during the 2011 Norway attacks. In 2020, following intense public debate, the building's murals were removed and the remaining structure was demolished. The murals are planned to be incorporated into a replacement building.

== Gallery ==
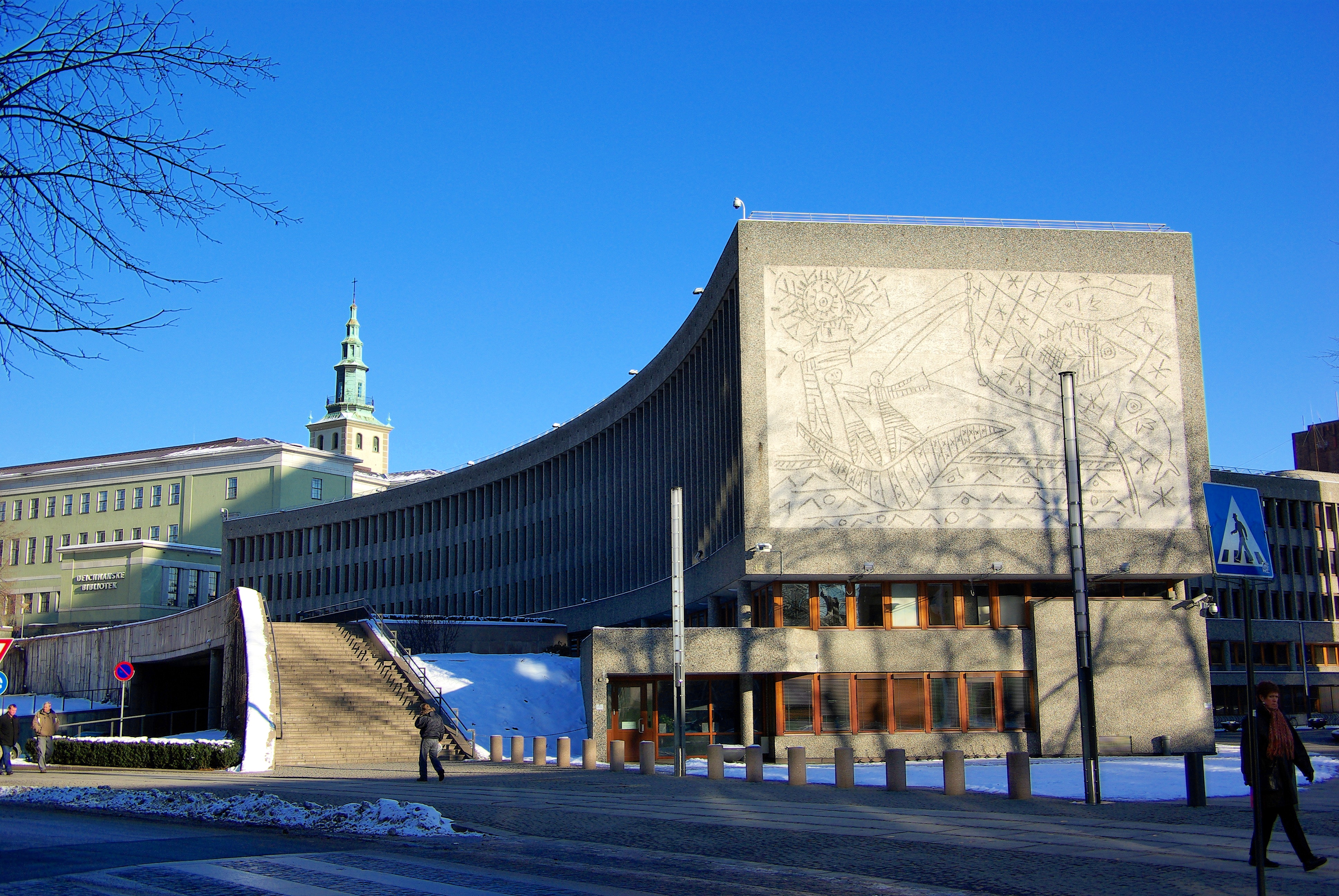
The facade of the Y-block towards Akersgata

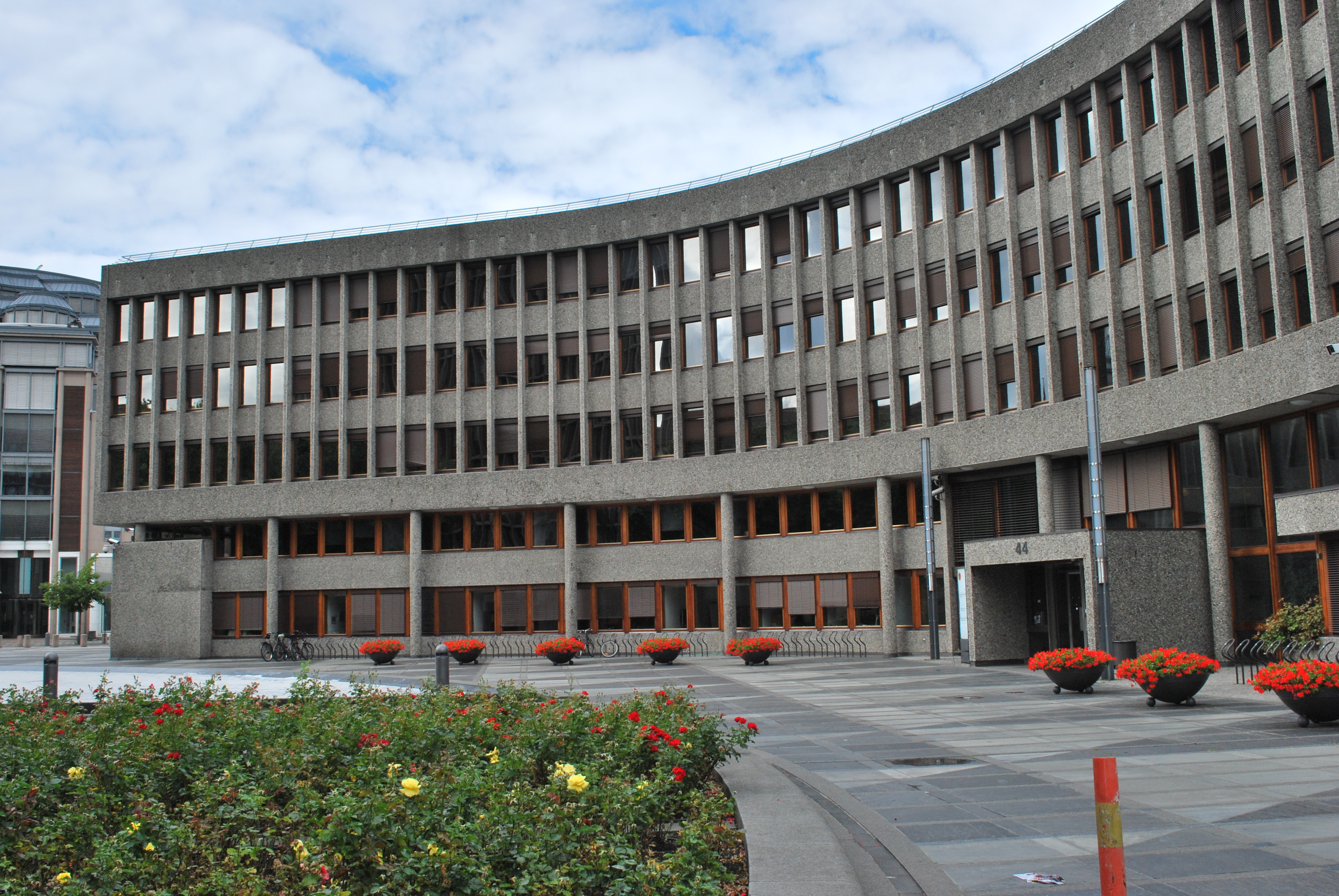
Facade of Y-block towards Regjeringsparken and Høyblokken, with main entrance

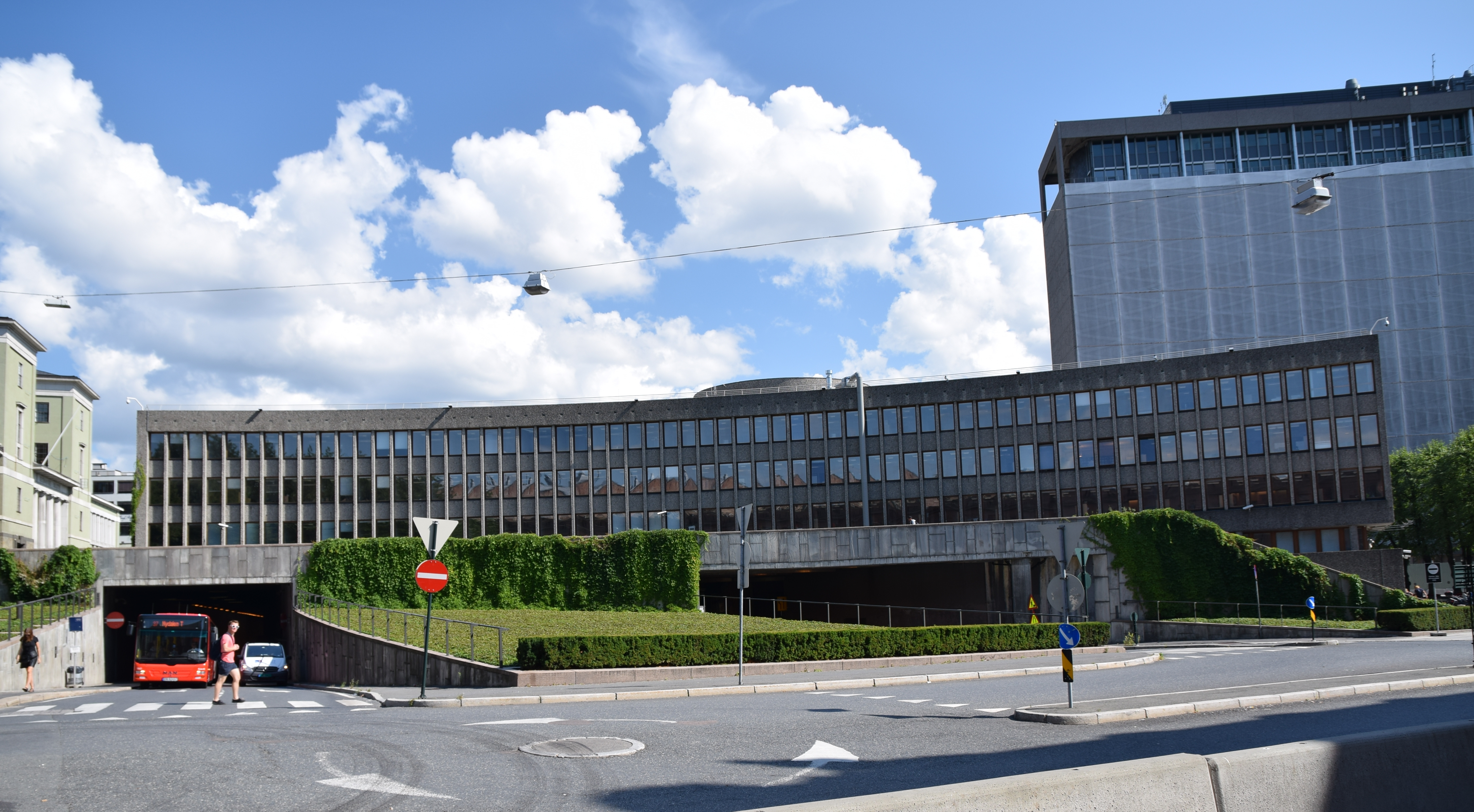
Y-block seen from Akersgata

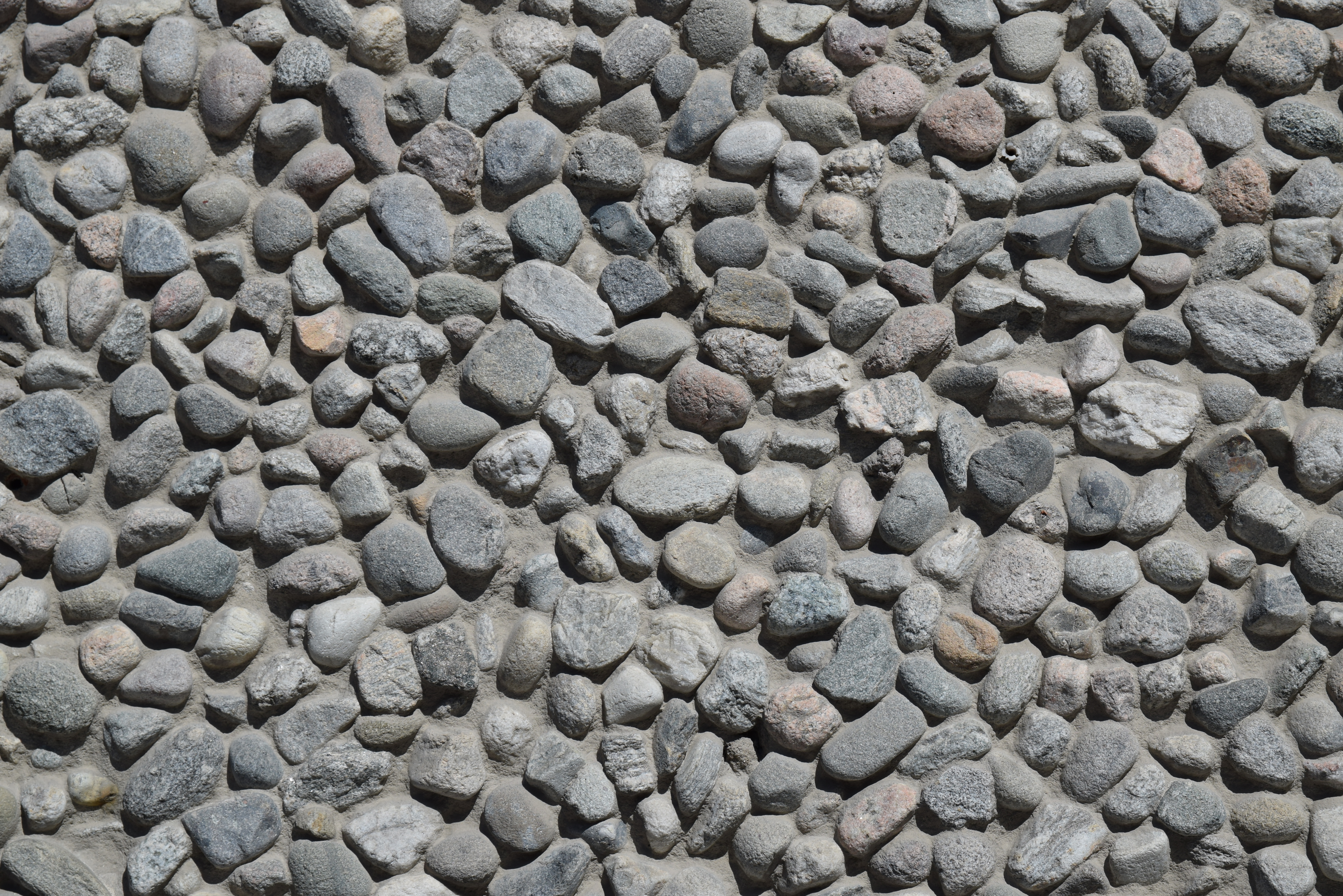
Facade in natural concrete. Short wall towards Akersgata

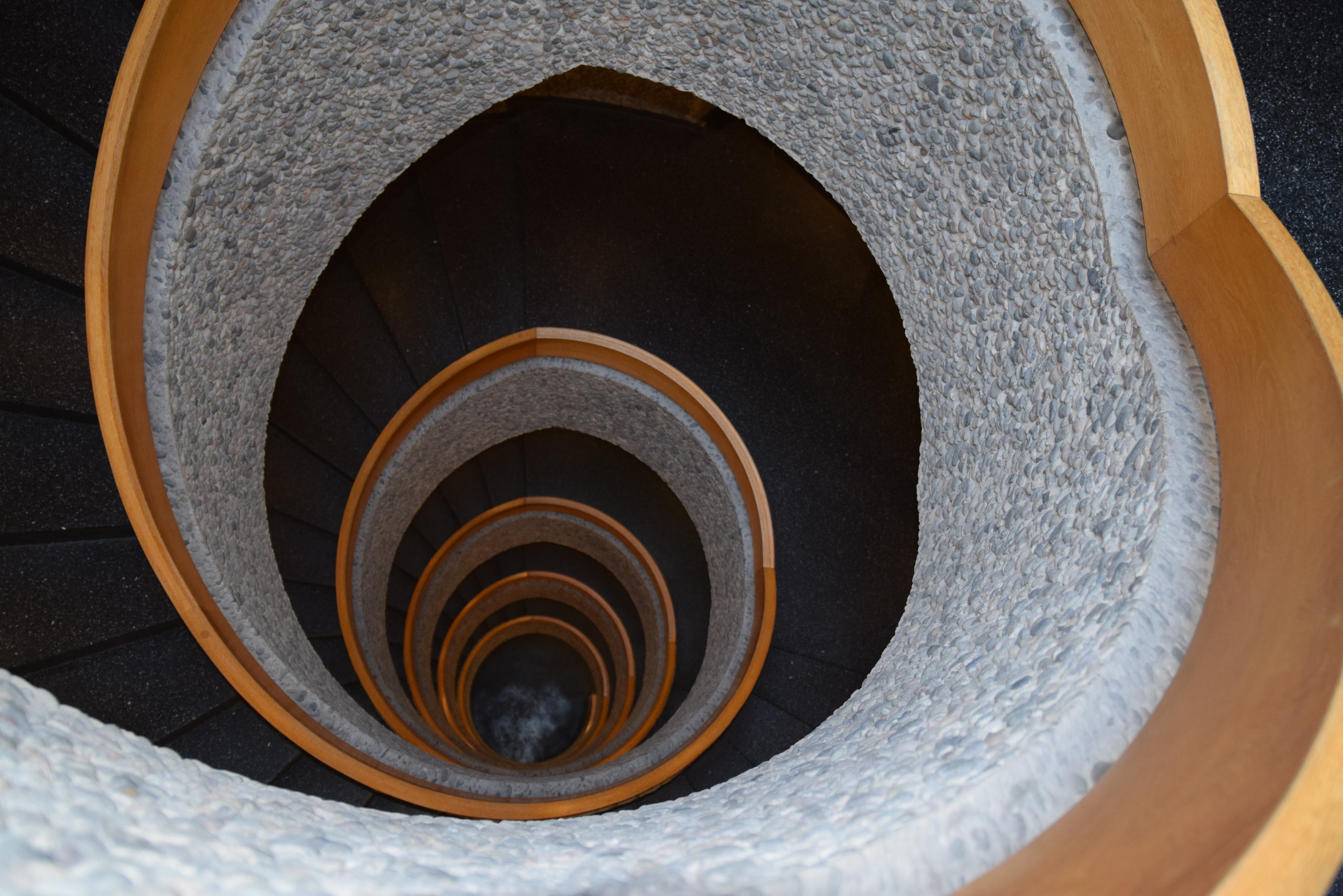
Stairs in the Y-block, shaped like a conch shell

=== Demolition ===
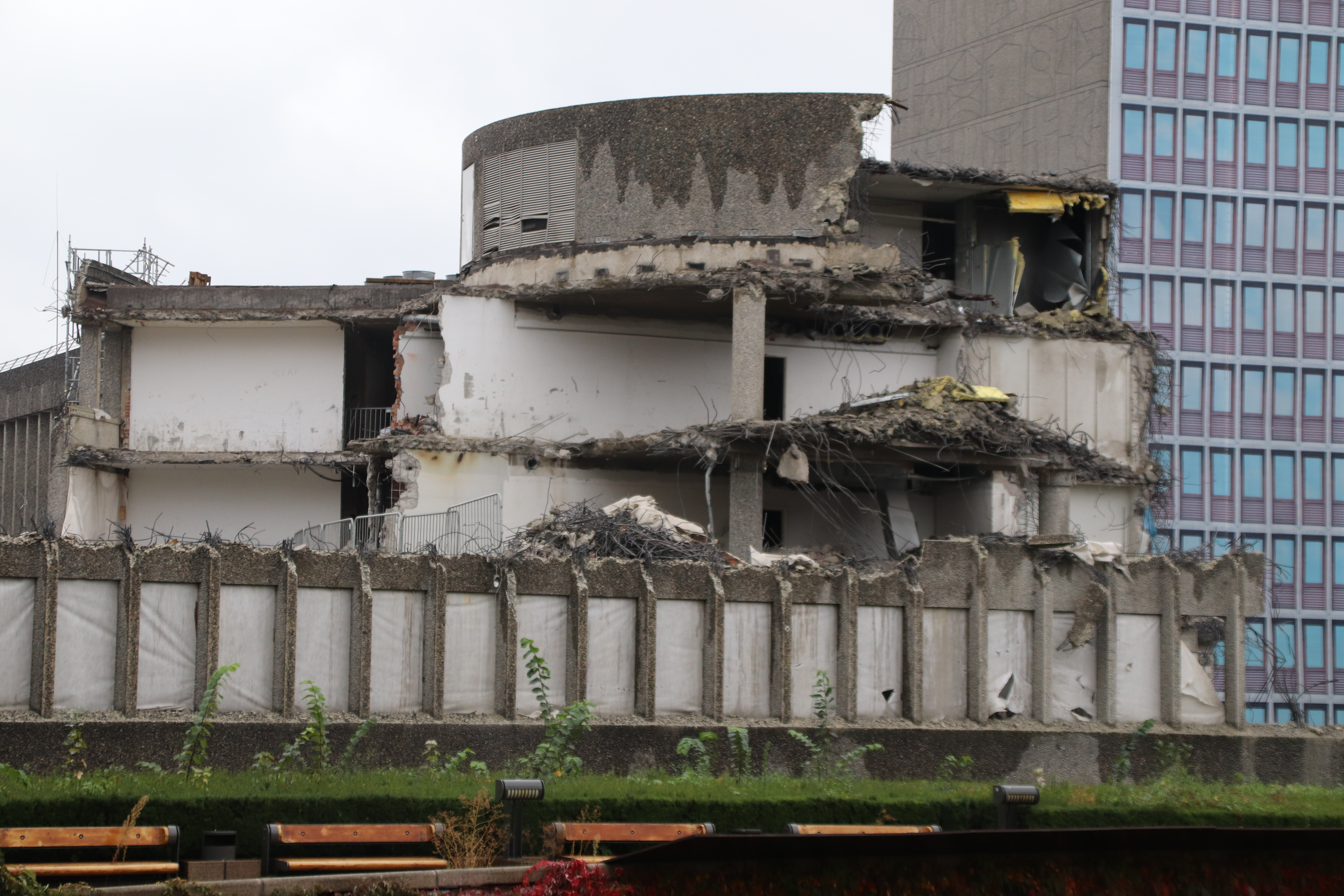
September 2020, high block behind

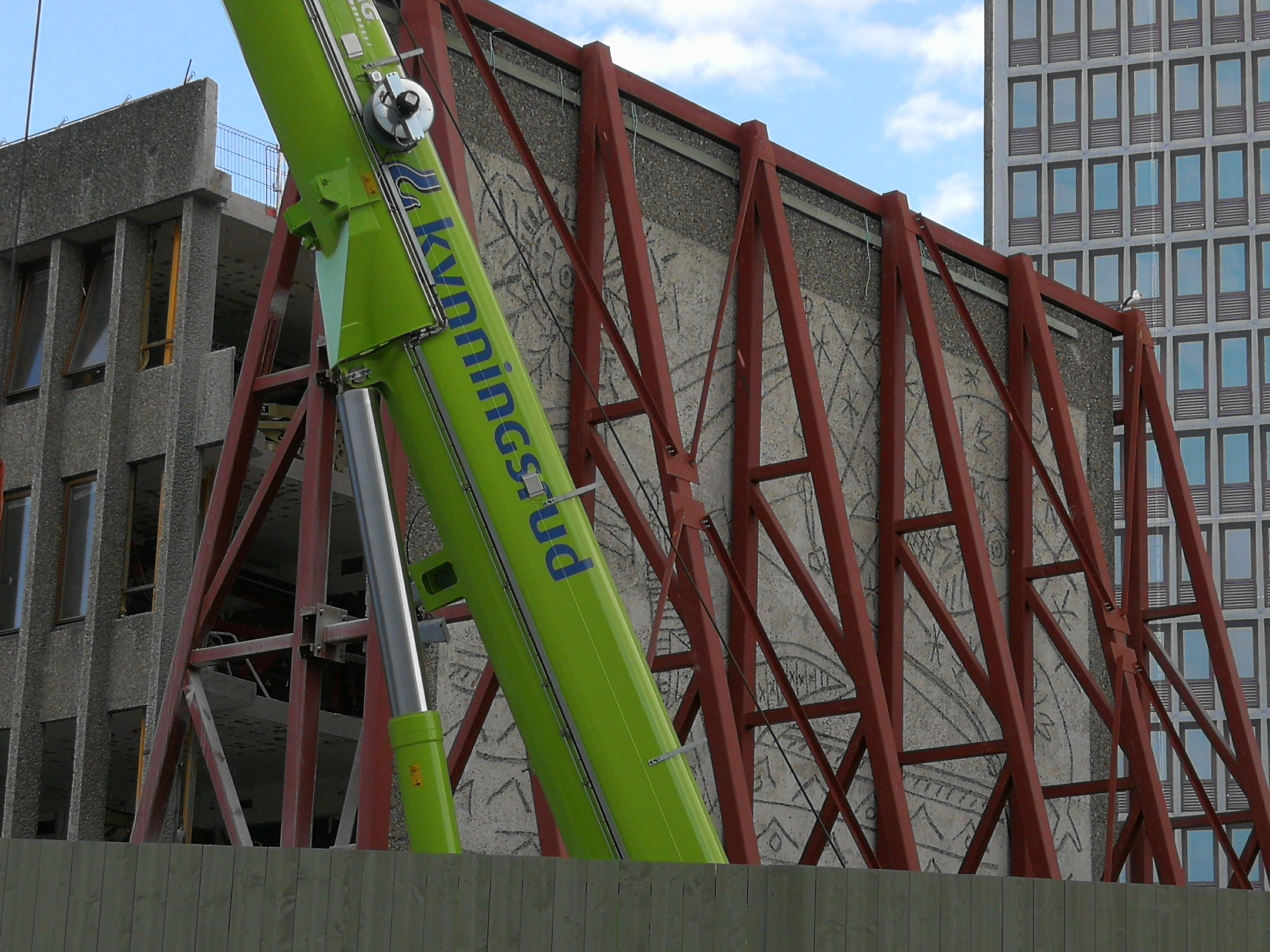
The short wall with The Fisherman during dismantling

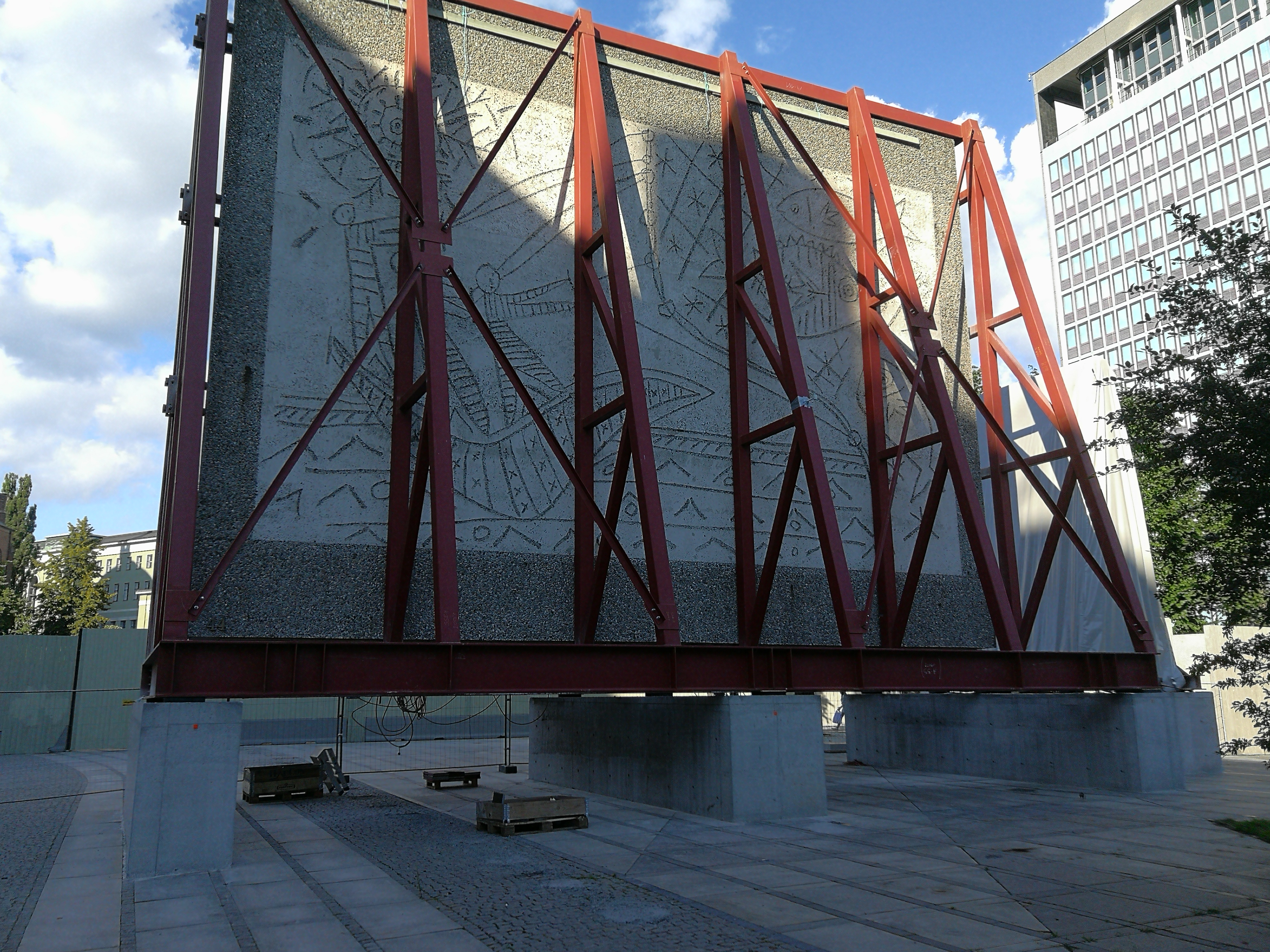
The wall with The Fisherman placed in a temporary steel frame (front)

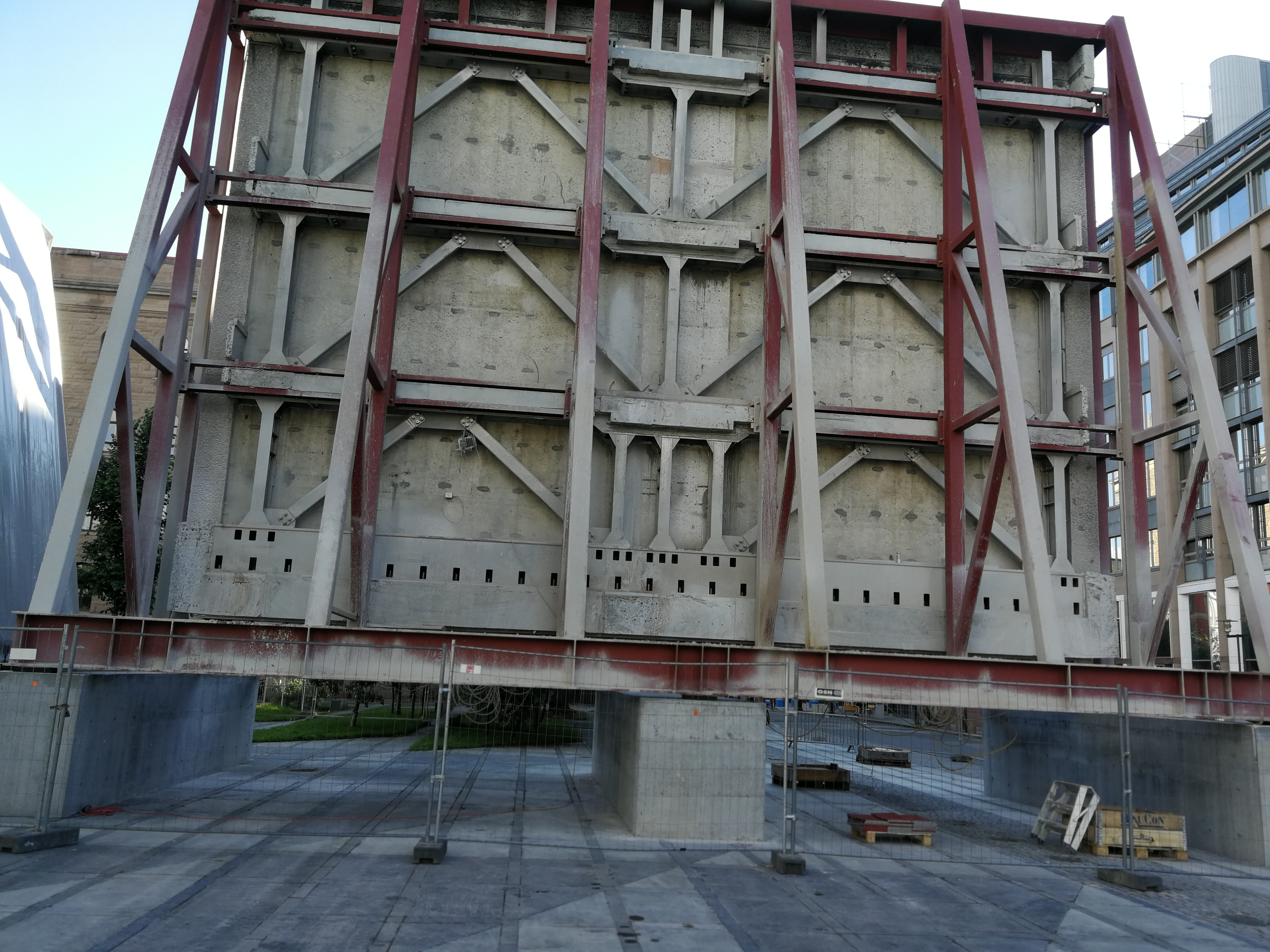
The wall with The Fisherman placed in a temporary steel frame (back)

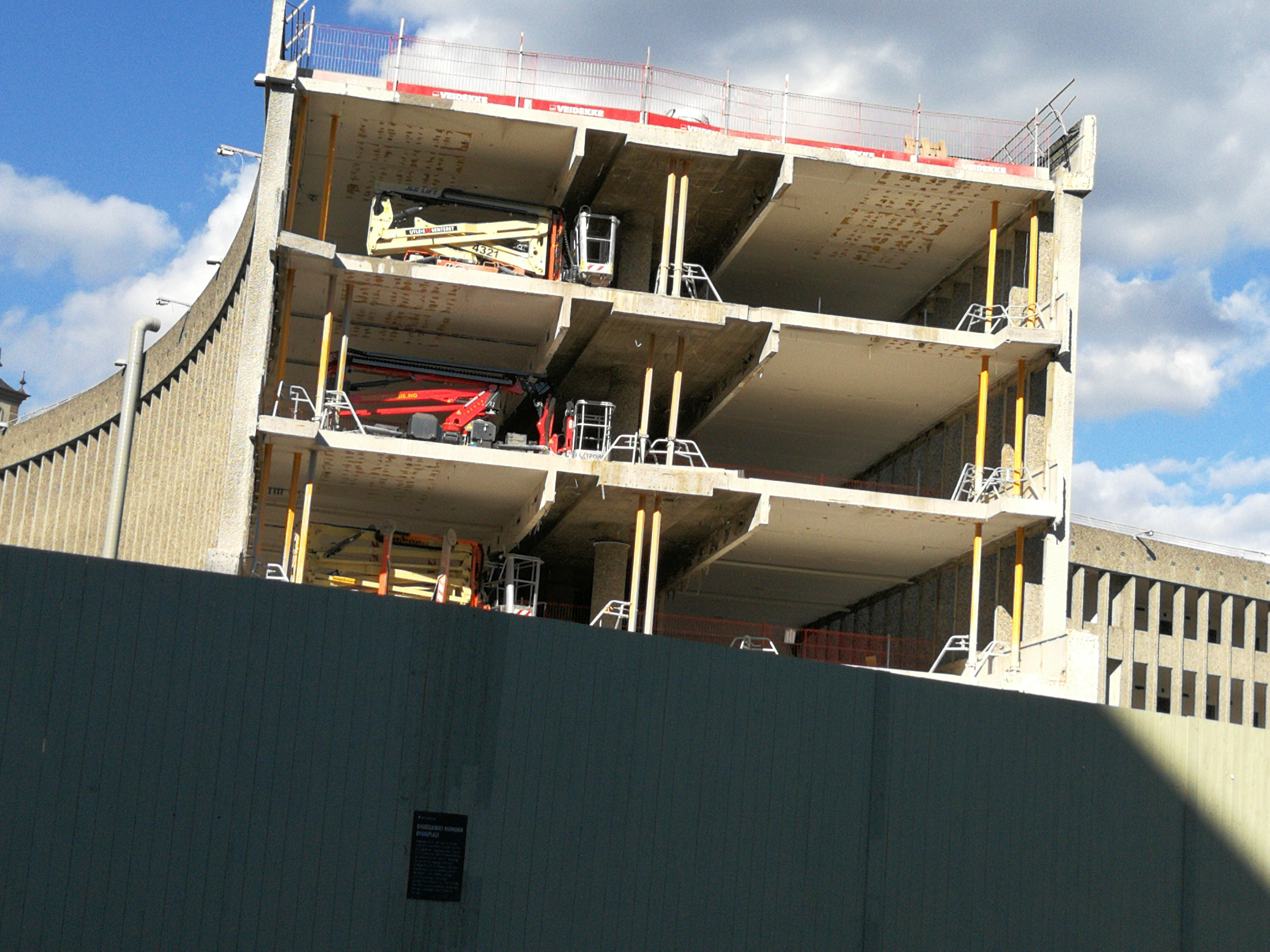
Y-Block with short wall removed
