= Regjeringskvartalet =

Norwegian government office buildings in Oslo

Coordinates: 59°54′54″N 10°44′45″E

Regjeringskvartalet seen from Johan Nygaardsvolds plass. To the left: A-blokken To the right: H-blokken

A-blokken on the left together with D-blokken to the right.

Regjeringskvartalet (the Government Quarter) is a collection of buildings located in the centre of Norway's capital city Oslo, housing several offices for the Norwegian Government. The complex is situated approximately 300m northeast of the Parliament Building, and consists of nine buildings with about 1,960,000 sq f (182,000 m^{2}) of office space for approximately 4,430 people.

== History ==
The current site was originally occupied by a district, named Empirekvartalet for its numerous neoclassical buildings, constructed in Empire style. As early as 1885, plans existed for constructing a governmental district in central Oslo. After numerous attempts were made to finalise plans, the Empirekvartalet was finally razed in the early 1950s. The destruction of the district was widely opposed by many members of the citizenry and conservator authorities. Select wooden buildings were deconstructed and placed in storage and were later re-assembled at other sites in the city.

The new Regjeringskvartalet was subsequently established and constructed in a contemporary modernist style.

On 22 July 2011, Regjeringskvartalet was the site of a car bombing in connection with the Norway attacks. Eight people were killed and over 200 others injured, and several buildings were heavily damaged. Following the damage, the decision was taken by the government to demolish and reconstruct the Regjeringskvartalet to meet updated standards for security, working space and environmental regulations.

The quarters were officially reopened on 13 April 2026, with several ministries moving back in to the area.

== Overview ==
Regjeringskvartalet consists of the following buildings:

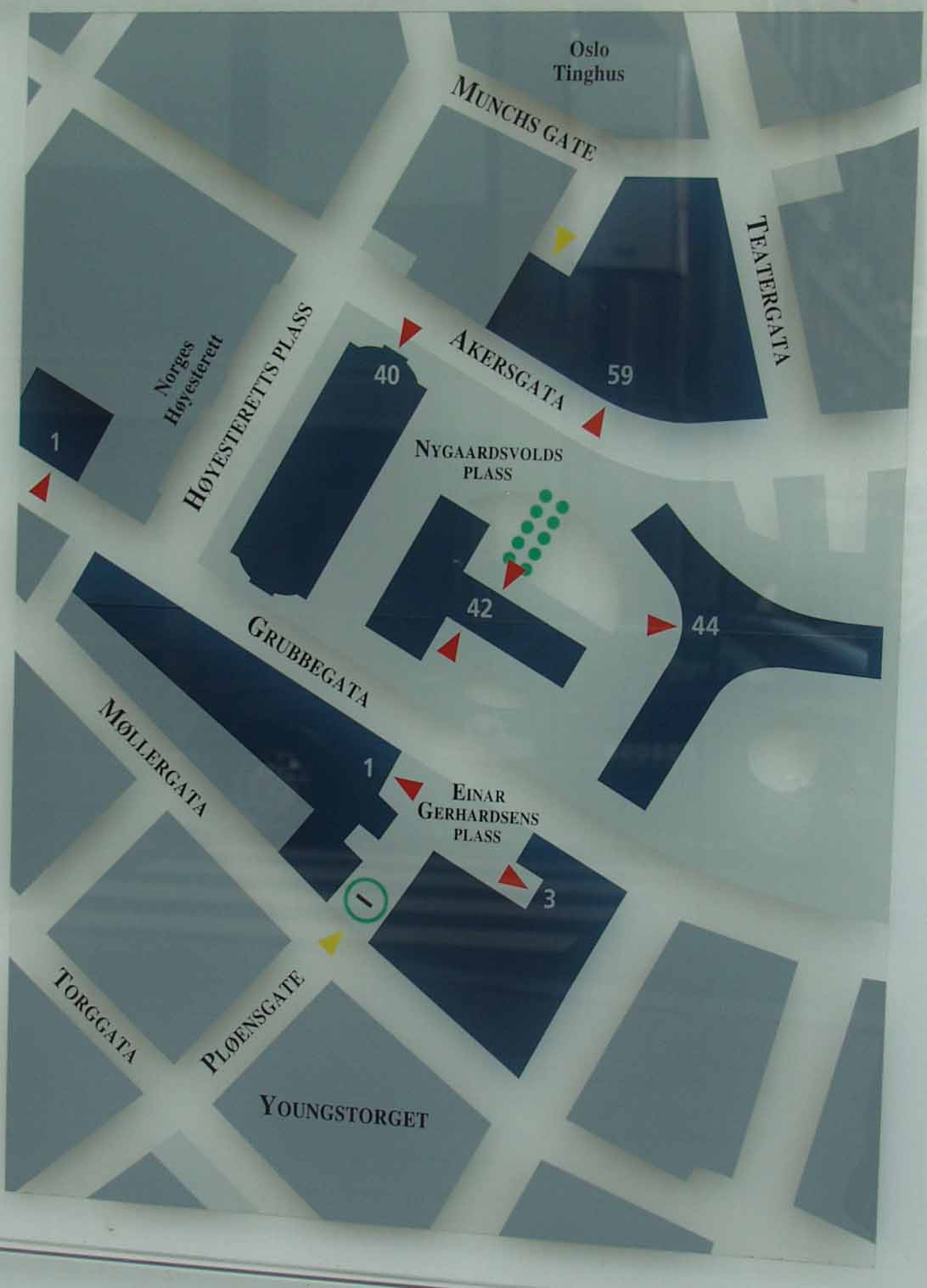
Map of Regjeringskvartalet prior to 2011

- Akersgata 40 (G-blokken - "The G-Building") from 1905, the first phase of development from the original plan; now the Ministry of Finance.
- Akersgata 42 (Regjeringsbygget - "The Cabinet Building" a.k.a. høyblokken - "the highrise") from 1958, designed by Erling Viksjø in the modernist style; until 22 July 2011 the Office of the Prime Minister and the Ministry of Justice and the Police.
- Akersgata 44 (Y-blokken - "The Y-Block"), from 1969, another modernist building by Erling Viksjø; until 22 July 2011 the Ministry of Education and Research.
- Akersgata 59 (R5)—departementsgården from 1996 designed by Torstein Ramberg; houses the Ministry of Transport and Communications, the Ministry of Culture, the Ministry of Agriculture and Food, the Ministry of Government Administration, Reform and Church Affairs, the Ministry of Local Government and Regional Development, and the Ministry of Children, Equality and Social Inclusion.
- Einar Gerhardsens plass 1 (R4); housed the Ministry of Petroleum and Energy and the Ministry of Trade and Industry.
- Einar Gerhardsens plass 3 and Møllergata 19 (S-block); housed the Ministry of Health and Care Services and the Ministry of Labour.
- The Government Administration Services, centred in Møllergata 19, provides administrative services to other Government departments. Statsbygg manages the buildings on behalf of the Norwegian state, and is responsible for running and maintaining Regjeringskvartalet.
- At Teatergata 9, a new building, R6, was completed in 2012. The 16 story building houses the Ministry of Health and Care Services and the Ministry of Agriculture and Food.

== Art ==
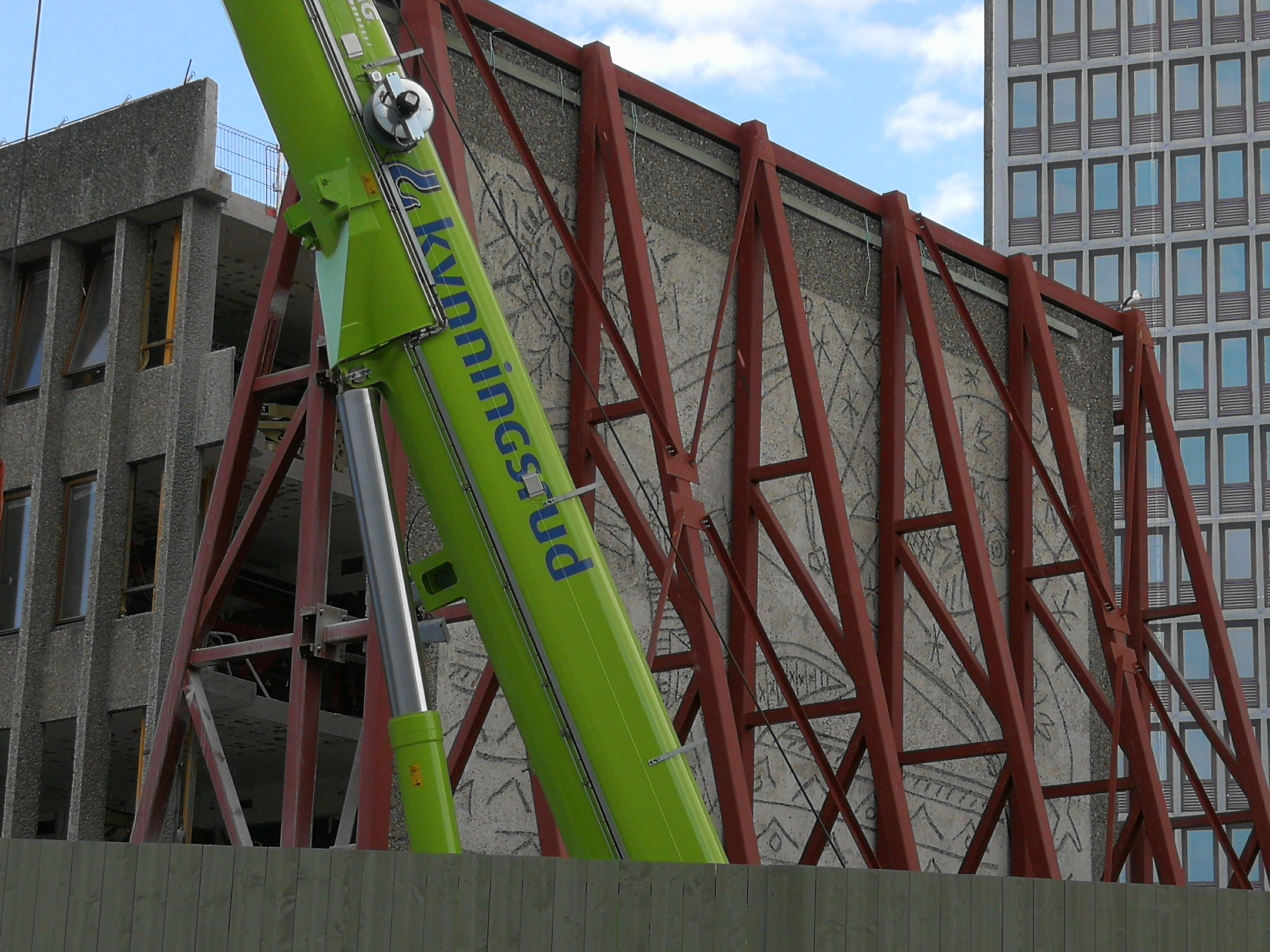
The Fisherman was removed in 2020, from the facade of "Building Y", or Y-blokka.

Between the late 1950s and the early 1970s, artist Pablo Picasso made sketches for his first five monumental concrete murals to be executed on the buildings’ interiors and exteriors. The largest, The Fisherman (1970) is still in Akersgata (as of the 4th quarter of 2020); it is standing in a temporary edifice, and some of the mural's surface can be seen thru the edifice's windows; the mural was removed from the façade of Y-block, in July 2020. Norwegian artists Inger Sitter, Kai Fjell and Carl Nesjar, among others, also made works for the buildings. When the government considered whether to demolish the buildings after the 2011 attacks, the Norwegian Directorate for Cultural Heritage expressed its fears that Picasso’s murals for two of them might be destroyed in the process.

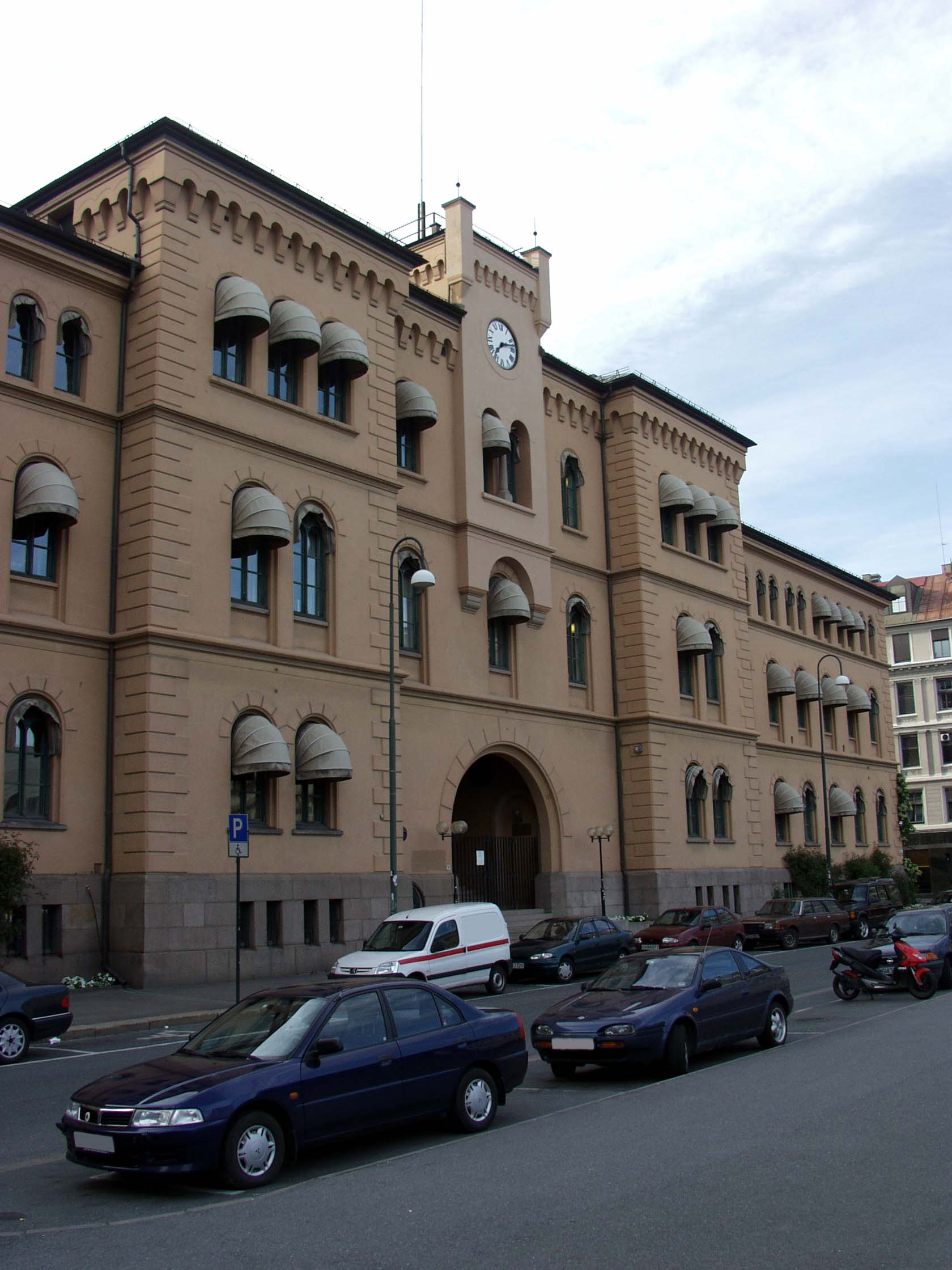
Møllergata 19, a part of the S-block

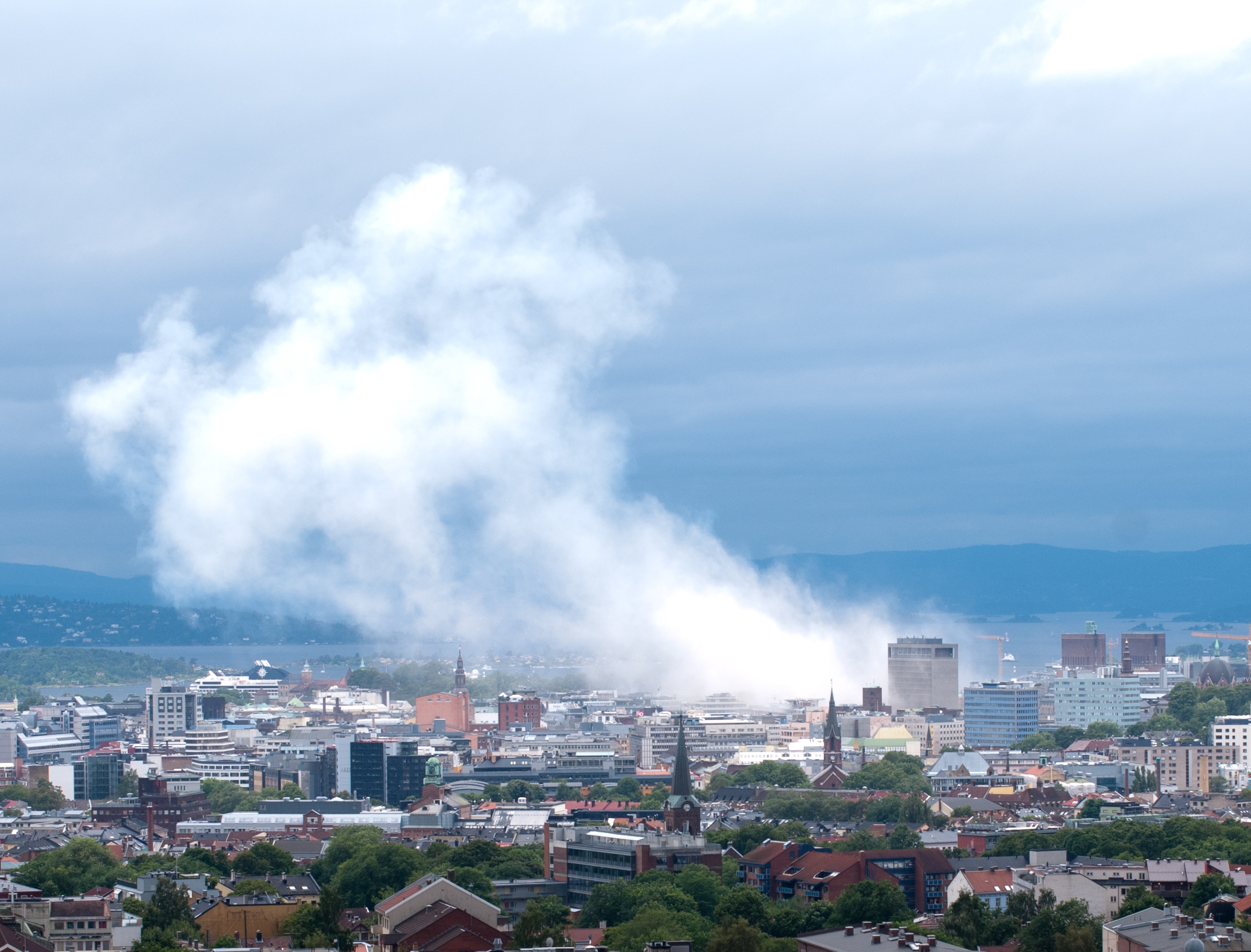
Regjeringskvartalet after the 22 July 2011 bombing
