= Bystrup Architecture Design Engineering =

Danish architecture and design firm

Bystrup Arkitekter (BYSTRUP) is a Danish architecture and design firm established in 1994. The office is located at Vermundsgade 40 A in Copenhagen, Denmark.

== Organization ==
The company employs between 11–50 planners, architects, and designers. The workforce consists of junior and senior architects and business professionals.

== Work overview ==
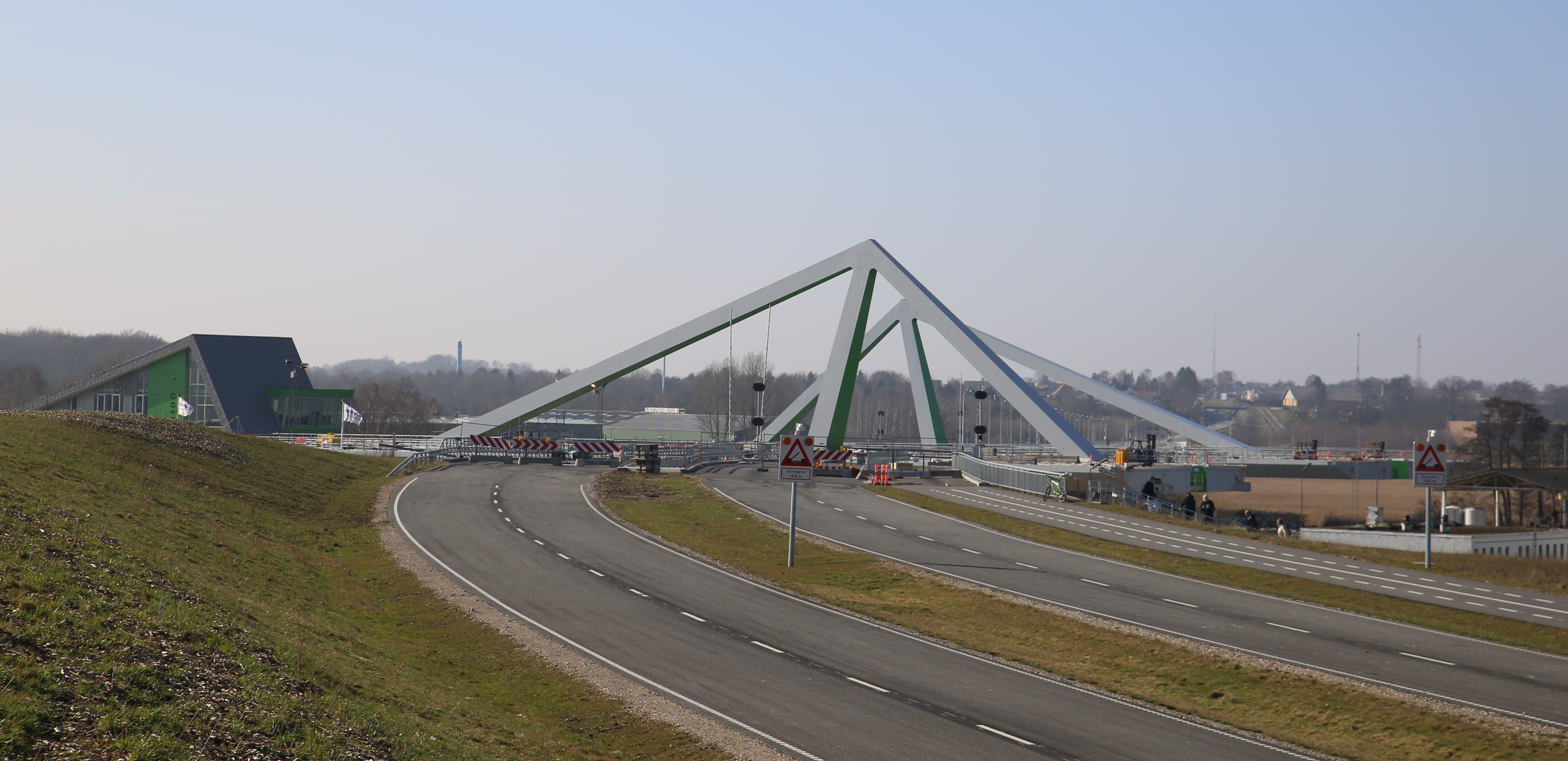
Odins Bro, a swing bridge at Odense, designed by Bystrup

The company mainly focuses on developing buildings, bridges, and power pylons.

Among others, BYSTRUP has created the energy efficient Pandora HQ, located in the heart of Copenhagen. The company is also the creator of Neue Messe München, the Munich Trade Fair, and Norges Varemesse, the Norwegian Trade Fair.

In 2015, Bystrup and partners won the design for a pedestrian bridge between Nine Elms and Pimlico in London, with spiral ramps preserving parks at both ends. Bystrup has furthermore designed the Langelinje Bridge in central Copenhagen, as well as several motorway bridges and projects abroad.

Starting in 2001, the company has been developing new design power pylons. These have been installed and energized in Denmark and abroad (see below).

== Tubular power pylons and awards ==
=== The Design Pylon ===
The BYSTRUP Design Pylon was awarded 1st prize in an international competition organised by the Danish TSO Energinet.dk in 2001. At present, about 80 of these pylons have been erected in Denmark and are energized since 2004.

=== The Eagle Pylon ===
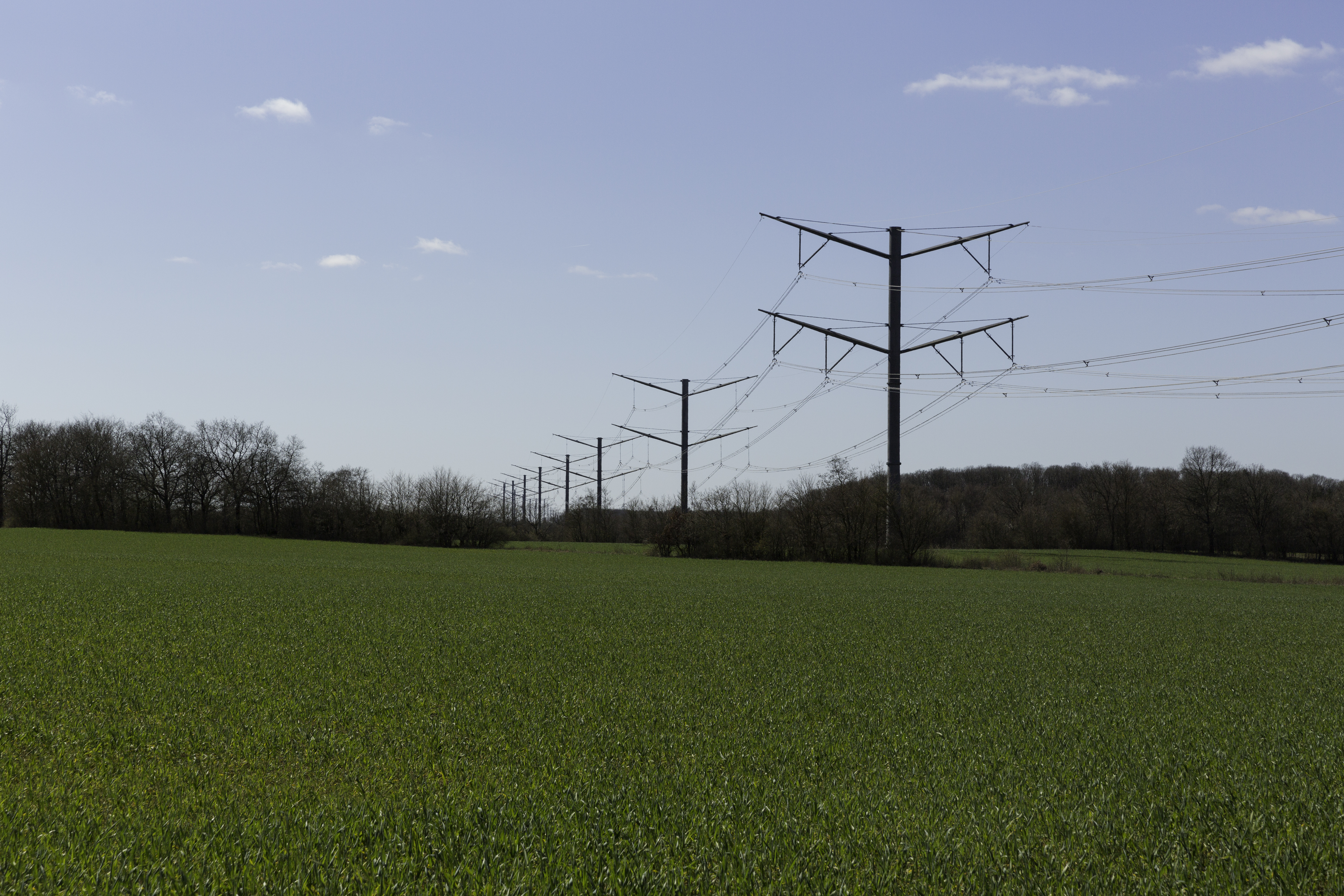
Eagle pylons of the Kassø–Tjele 400 kV power line in Denmark (2019)

After winning another competition in Denmark, 500 pylons are installed an energized on a main 400kV line in Denmark with a design called "Eagle". Operational in late 2014 and carrying 2x1,800 MW.

=== T-Pylon ===
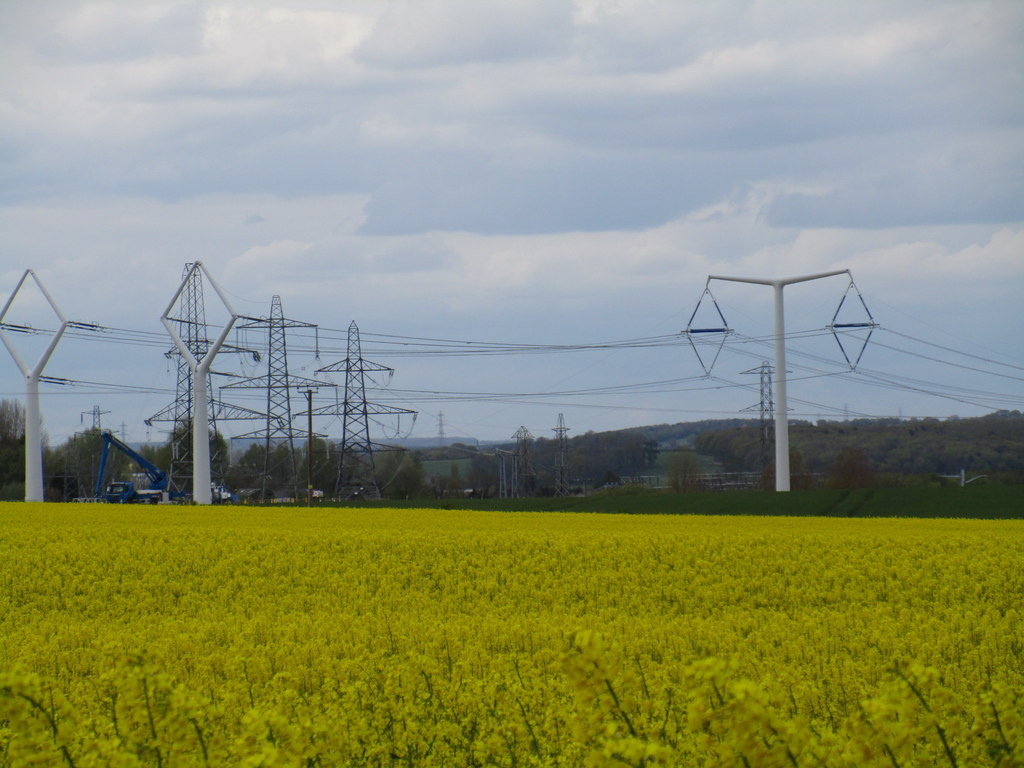
End of line of T-pylons

In 2011, following a design competition managed by RIBA Competitions the Royal Institute of British Architects awarded a £5,000 reward to Bystrup for a new design of electrical towers called the T-Pylon, designed by Bystrup architect Rasmus Jessing. The design, which energy secretary Chris Huhne called "an innovative design which is simple, classical and practical", is set to replace the 88,000 pylons that have been in use in the United Kingdom since the 1920s. This design, which lowers the size from 50 to 32 metres (164 to 105 ft) and 30 to 20 tonnes (30 to 20 long tons; 33 to 22 short tons), is lauded for its appearance and energy conservation ability. The Pylon's conductors are in a unique triangular configuration which should theoretically minimize the extent of circuits and magnetic fields. The project will play a role in the United Kingdom's plan to reduce carbon emissions by 80% by 2050 because energy production and use will rely heavily on electricity.
