= Police Headquarters =

1932 crime radio drama

Police Headquarters was a 1932 crime radio drama. Bruce Eells Associates produced this series which was syndicated to West Coast NBC radio stations. Each program lasted for about 15 minutes: music was featured in the first part of the show, an announcer would do a commercial or two, then the 12 minute episode would follow. A total of thirty-nine episodes were produced.

The program centered on a citizen reporting a crime via telephone and police use of two-way radio to set up a dragnet to find criminals and solve cases. While the programs were based upon actual cases, they were presented in the program as successfully solved, regardless of the actual outcome. The police in the drama would investigate a murder, a bank robbery, etc. and apprehend the perpetrators. In some cases the drama was identifying the perpetrator, while more often it was in apprehending them.

== See also ==
- Old-time radio
