= Erling Viksjø =

Norwegian architect (1910–1971)

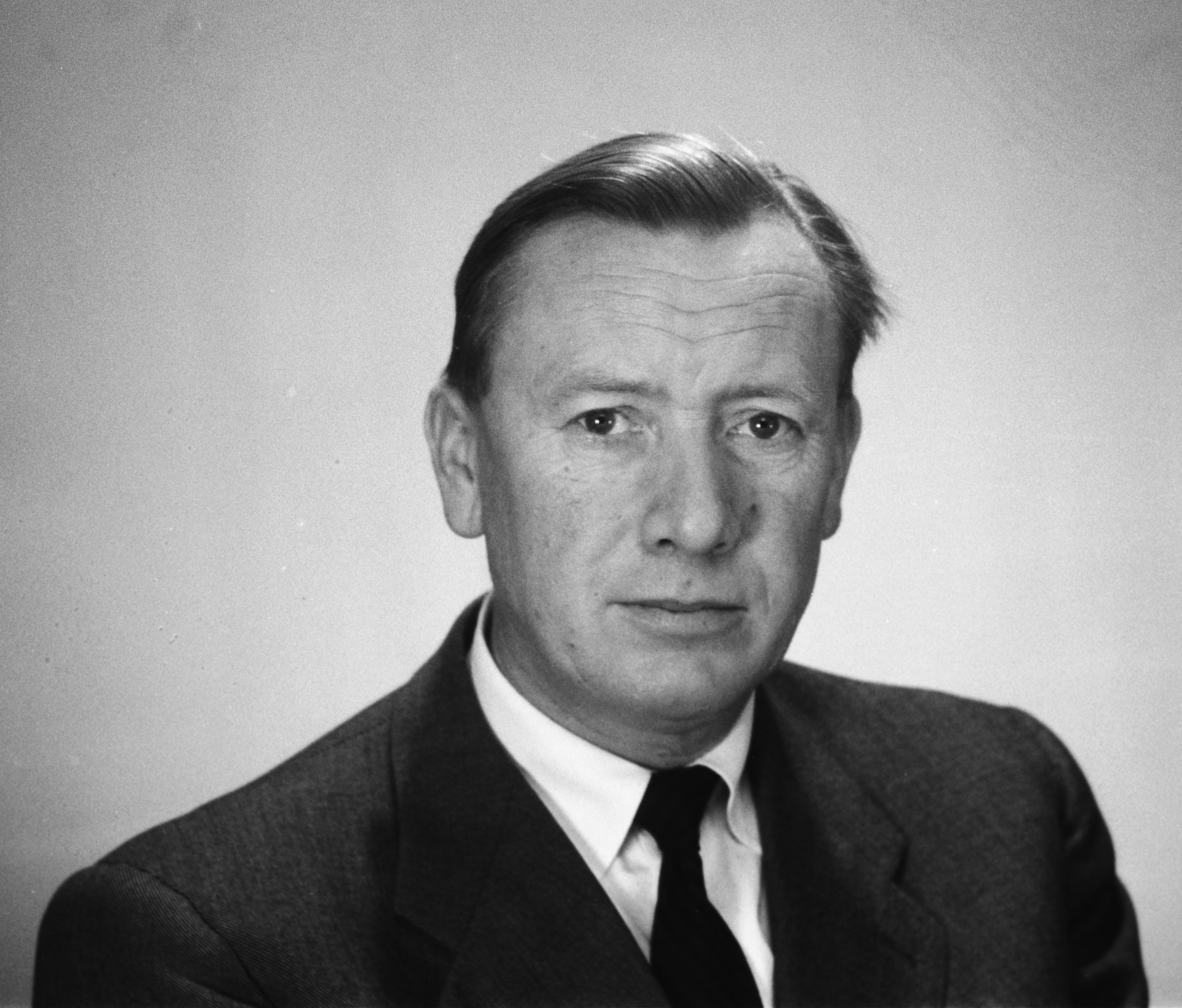
- Viksjø in 1959
- Born: 4 July 1910; Trondheim
- Died: 2 December 1971 (aged 61)
- Occupation: Architect
- Awards: Betongtavlen, 1961
- Buildings: Bakkehaugen Church

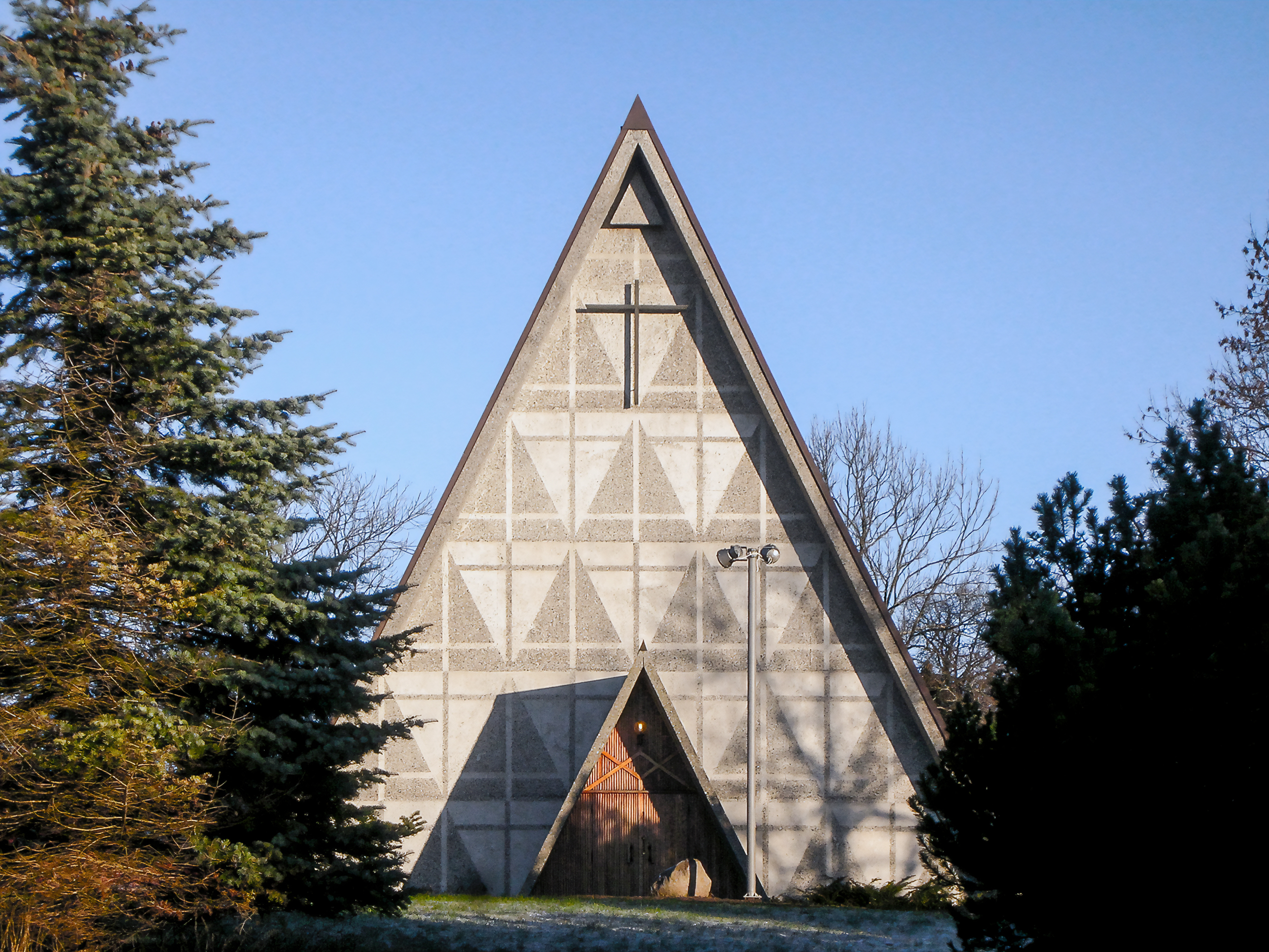
Bakkehaugen Church with Ove Bang

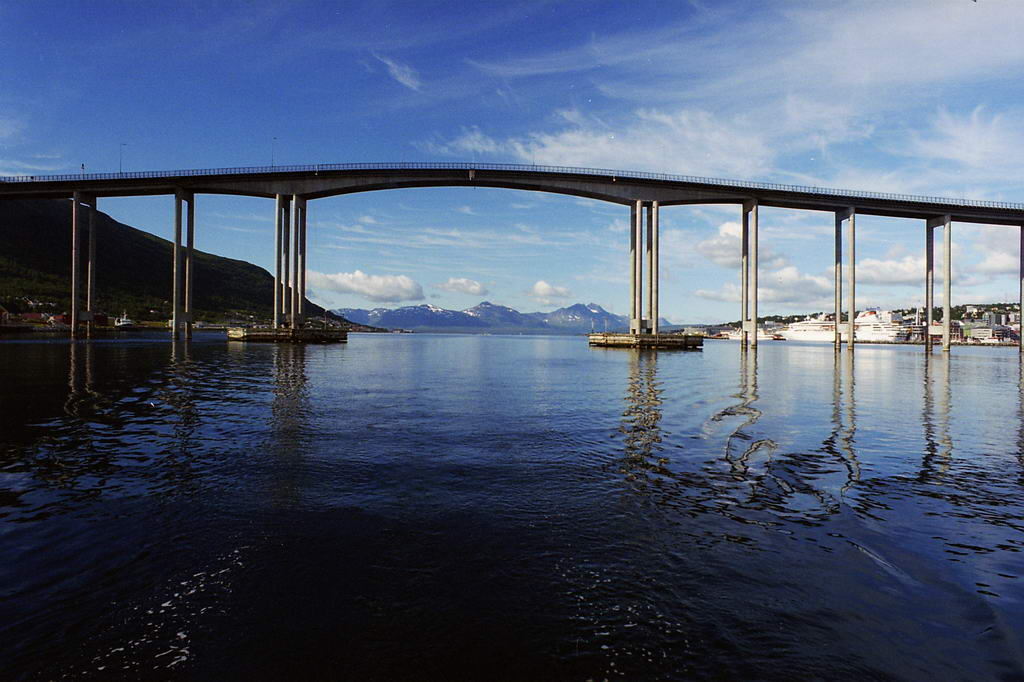
Tromsø Bridge

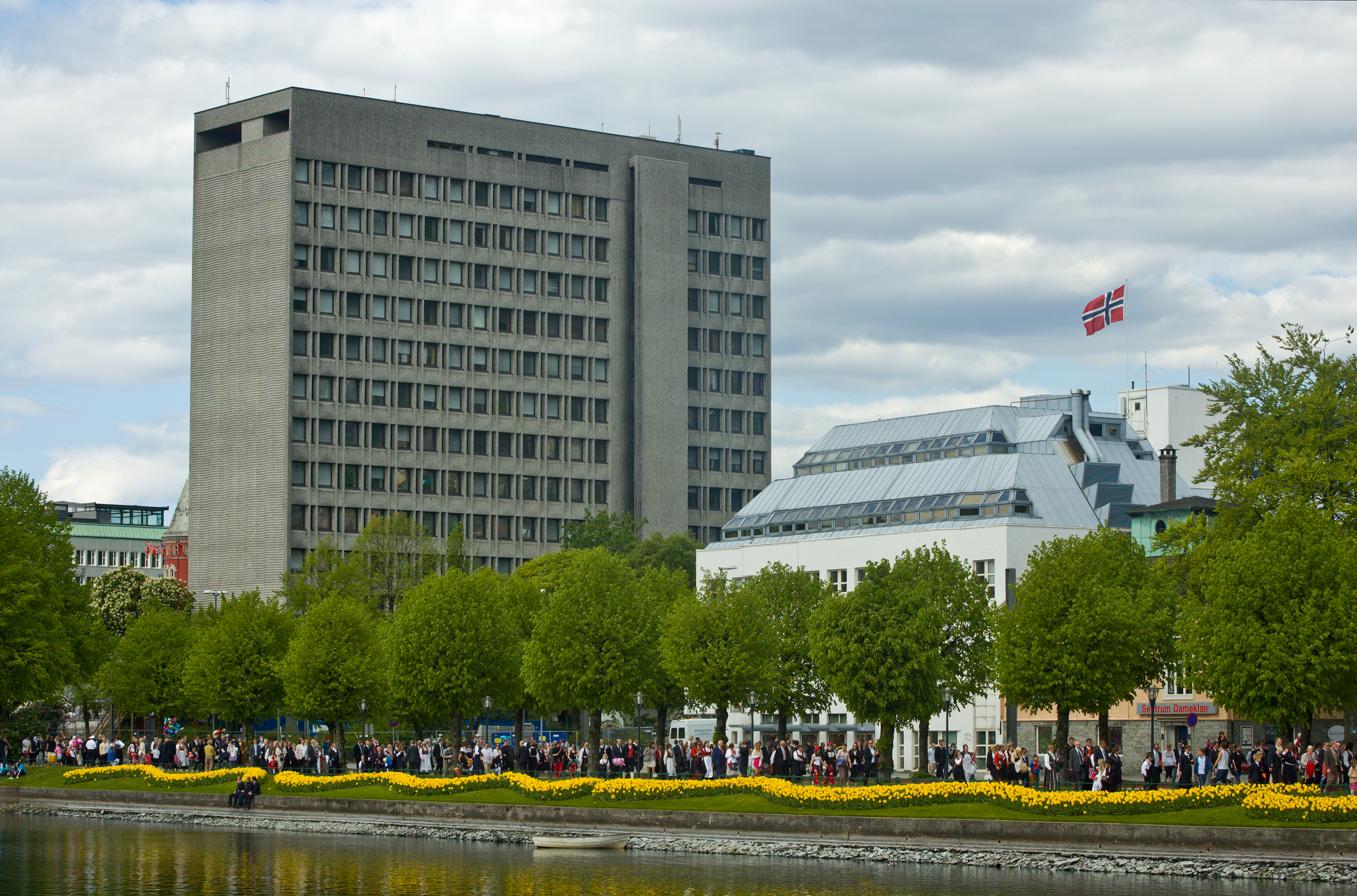
Bergen City Hall

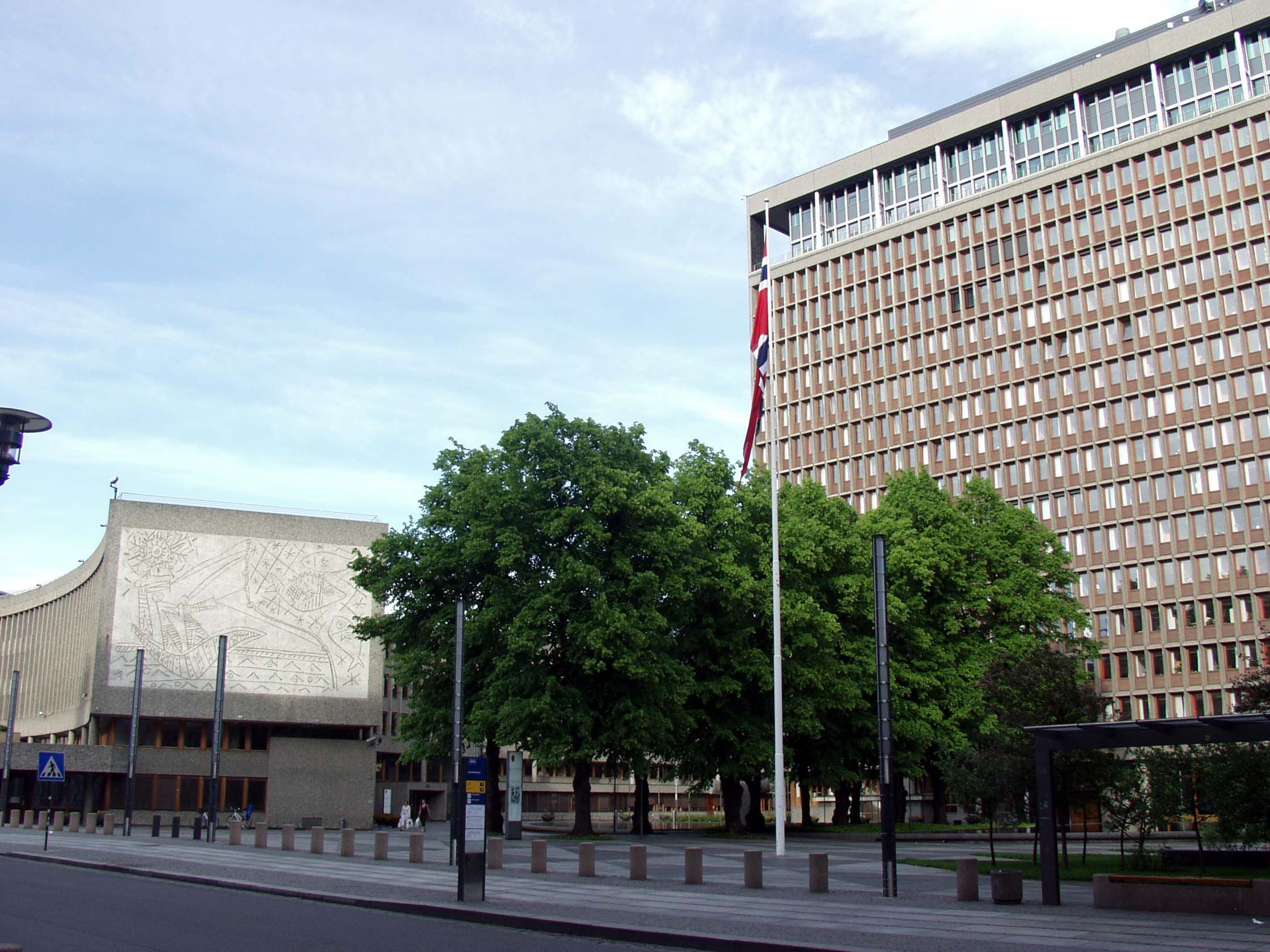
Regjeringskvartalet in Oslo

Erling Viksjø (4 July 1910 – 2 December 1971) was a Norwegian architect. Viksjø was an early exponent of architectural modernism. He was also noted for his use of textured concrete as a building material in a number of his designs.

== Biography ==
Viksjø was born in Trondheim, Norway. He studied architecture at the Norwegian Institute of Technology (Norges tekniske høgskole) until 1935. He then moved to Oslo where he joined the firm of architect Ove Bang. During World War II, he led the architectural firm following the death of Bang in 1942. During the occupation of Norway by Nazi Germany Viksjø was imprisoned in Grini concentration camp from April 1944 to the war's end in May 1945. After the war he started his own architectural office.

Among his designs are Bakkehaugen Church (Bakkehaugen kirke) in Oslo and Tromsø Bridge (Tromsøbrua) in Tromsø. He earned the architecture and civil engineering award Betongtavlen in 1961 for Bakkehaugen Church and 1963 for Tromsø Bridge.

Viksjø is particularly known for his natural concrete treatment which was patented as Naturbetong. In 1950, he was co-inventor (together with civil engineer Sverre Jystad) of this method of casting and machining concrete to achieve special surface effects in facades. A number of Viksjø designed buildings are listed with natural concrete including the high-rise government block in Oslo (Regjeringskvartalet), Bergen City Hall (Bergen rådhus) as well as headquarter buildings of Norsk Hydro in Bygdøy and Standard Telefon og Kabelfabrik.

== Selected designs ==
- Regjeringsbygningen in Oslo, 1946–59
- Fisheries School in Honningsvåg, 1950–56
- Marmorberget housing company in Oslo, 1952–54
- Hangars at Bodø and Ørland main flight station, 1952–56
- Nordnorsk student home in Oslo, 1953–60
- Bakkehaugen Church in Oslo, 1955–59
- Oslo Health Council in Oslo, 1956–69
- Y-Block in the Government Quarter in Oslo, 1956–70
- Channel Bridge in Tønsberg, 1957
- Nordseter fjellkirke at Lillehammer, 1958–64
- Norsk Hydro administration building in Oslo, 1960–63
- Elkemhuset, Middelthuns in Oslo, 1960–65
- Tromsøbrua in Tromsø, 1963
- Cinema and samlingen at Lillehammer, 1963
- Standard Telefon og Kabelfabrik in Oslo, 1968
- Bergen City Hall in Bergen, 1968–74
