= Bust of Sylvette =

Sculpture by Pablo Picasso and Carl Nesjar

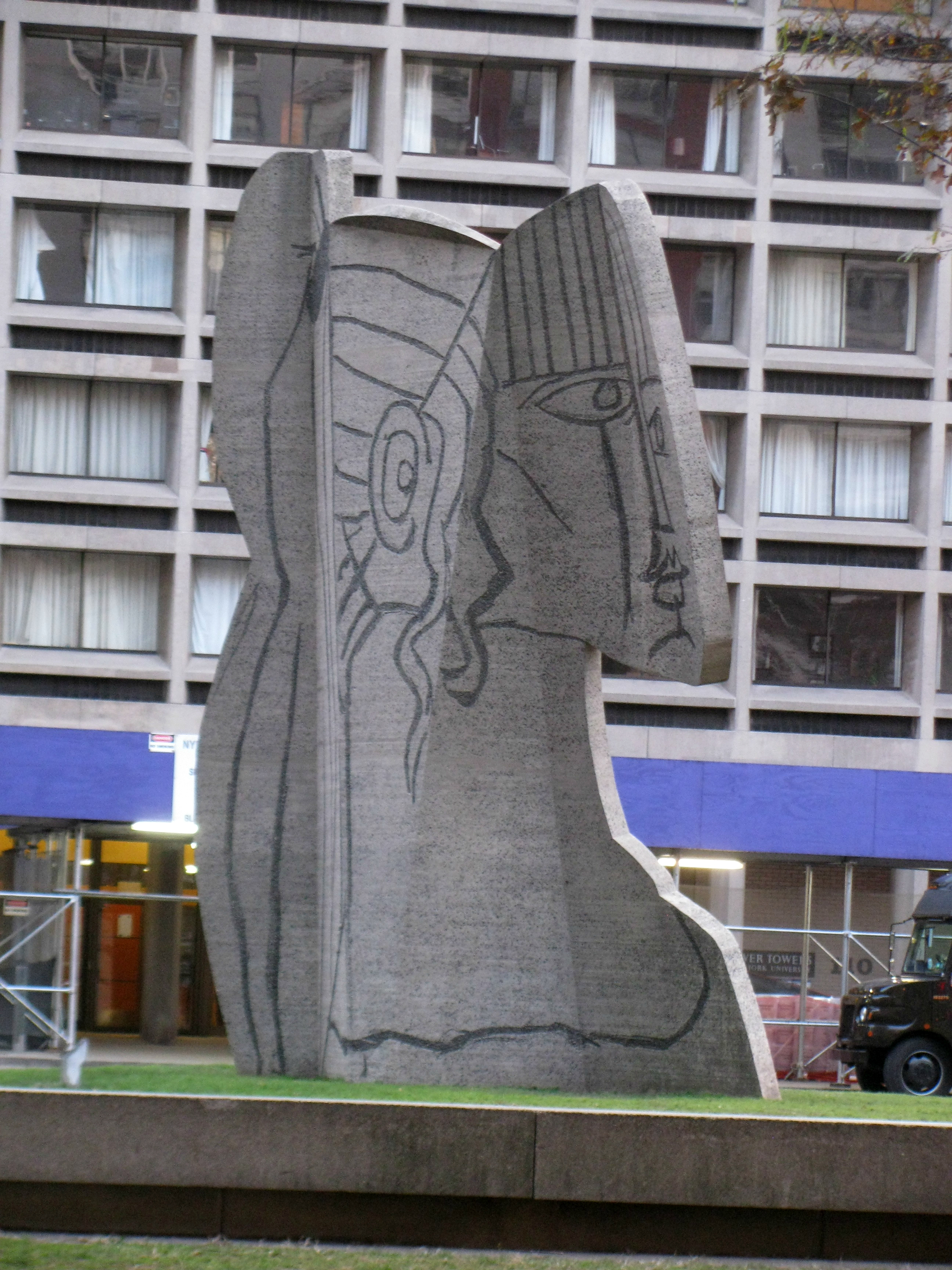
- Artist: Pablo Picasso, Carl Nesjar
- Year: 1968
- Medium: Concrete
- Dimensions: 36 x 20 x 12.5 (ft)
- Location: New York, New York

Bust of Sylvette is a large sculpture located in New York City's University Village, designed by Pablo Picasso and built by his collaborator Carl Nesjar. Constructed in 1968, the sculpture was declared a New York City landmark in 2008 along with the surrounding buildings.

Like Sylvette in Rotterdam, Netherlands, Bust of Sylvette is a sculpture inspired by Lydia Corbett, who was his muse for over 60 portraits in 1954.

== Background and construction ==
Bust of Sylvette was sculpted by the Norwegian artist Carl Nesjar in 1968 based on a design by Pablo Picasso, who had created a 2-foot-high (0.61 m) folded-metal version of the sculpture in 1954. I. M. Pei, the architect of University Village in New York City, had first become acquainted with Nesjar in 1958, when Nesjar had showed Pei some of his betograve artworks (in which concrete was sandblasted to create different textures). Picasso met Corbett near his studio in Vallauris, France in 1954, when she was 19 years old. Intrigued by her unique look, she became his muse for three months that same year and it's said that the ensuing Sylvette series was the inspiration "that launched a thousand French ponytails." Corbett's inspiration was not limited to France, however, as seen in subsequent sculptures. Like Rotterdam's Sylvette, New York's Bust of Sylvette was inspired by Picasso's original portraits and constructed using the betograve technique that Nesjar pioneered.

In November 1967, New York University commissioned Nesjar to create Bust of Sylvette for the University Village complex's courtyard. A model of the sculpture was being displayed at the Museum of Modern Art (MoMA) at the time, and two MoMA trustees—the art collector Allan D. Emil and his wife Kate—agreed to finance the construction of a full-sized artwork. A concrete foundation pad was installed in the complex's courtyard to support the weight of the 60-short-ton (54-long-ton; 54 t) sculpture. Bust of Sylvette was dedicated on December 9, 1968.

== Description ==
The sculpture measures 36 feet (11 m) high and weighs 60 short tons (54 long tons; 54 t). The sculpture is 20 feet (6.1 m) long at its widest point, and it is carved out of a slab measuring 12.5 inches (320 mm) thick. The figure is a sculpture in-the-round of the head, neck, and shoulders of a woman named Sylvette David, who is depicted with a pigtail. The sculpture includes black-stone basalt pebbles imported from Norway. Before the basalt pebbles were added to the sculpture, they were placed in watertight wooden boxes, which were then shaken to ensure that there were as few air pockets as possible. The spaces between the basalt were then filled with cement grout, and the resulting aggregate was then coated with in buff-colored cement. Parts of the cement are engraved, revealing pieces of the aggregate beneath it. Unlike Rotterdam's Sylvette, Bust of Sylvette is constructed in a pinwheel shape, matching the surrounding buildings.

Bust of Sylvette was originally intended for Kips Bay Towers, which Pei had also designed; however, Kips Bay Towers' developer William Zeckendorf had rejected the piece. Early drawings for Society Hill in Philadelphia indicate that a similar artwork was also planned for that development, though the piece was never executed there. In addition to serving as a lawn decoration, the sculpture was intended to emphasize University Village's pinwheel layout. A further plan by Christo and Jeanne-Claude in 1972 to wrap the sculpture in brown fabric was never completed.

== Significance and legacy ==
Both the sculpture and its surrounding buildings were designated New York City landmarks in 2008.

Bust of Sylvette was the second outdoor sculpture by Picasso to be built in the Western Hemisphere, following the unnamed sculpture at Chicago's Richard J. Daley Center. Bust of Sylvette is one of two concrete sculptures designed in collaboration between Nesjar and Picasso worldwide and is the sole outdoor Picasso piece in New York City.

== See also ==
- Chicago Picasso
- Picasso's Regjeringskvartalet murals

== Sources ==
- Fairweather, Sally H. (1982). Picasso's Concrete Sculptures. Hudson Hills Press. ISBN 978-0-933920-28-6.
- Postal, Matthew A. (November 18, 2008). University Village (PDF) (Report). New York City Landmarks Preservation Commission.
- Stern, Robert A. M.; Mellins, Thomas; Fishman, David (1995). New York 1960: Architecture and Urbanism Between the Second World War and the Bicentennial (1960 ed.). New York: Monacelli Press. ISBN 1-885254-02-4.
- Wiseman, Carter (2001). I.M. Pei A Profile in American Architecture. New York: Abrams. ISBN 978-0-8109-3477-1.
