= University Village (Manhattan) =

Development in Manhattan, New York

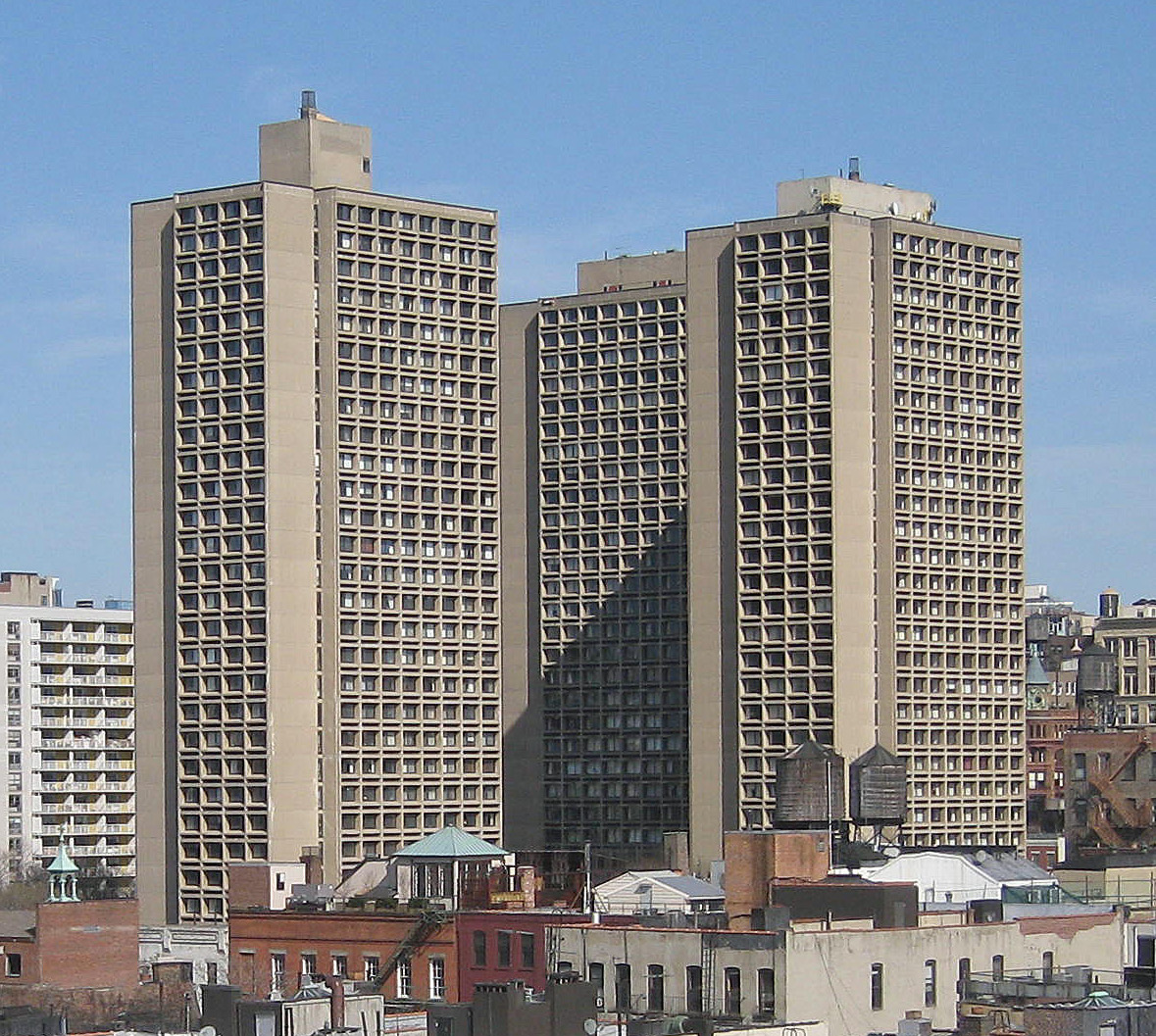
- The Silver Towers and 505 LaGuardia Place
- Interactive map of the University Village area

General information
- Type: Mixed-use (mostly residential)
- Location: Bounded by Bleecker Street, Mercer Street, Houston Street, and LaGuardia Place; Manhattan, New York, U.S.
- Coordinates: 40°43′36″N 73°59′55″W
- Construction started: August 12, 1964
- Completed: 1966
- Opening: 1967
- Owner: New York University

Height
- Roof: 275 ft (84 m)

Technical details
- Floor count: 30

Design and construction
- Architects: James Ingo Freed & I. M. Pei

New York City Landmark
- Designated: November 18, 2008
- Reference no.: 2300

University Village is a building complex owned by New York University in the Greenwich Village neighborhood of Manhattan in New York City, New York, U.S. University Village includes three residential towers built in the 1960s: 505 LaGuardia Place, a housing cooperative, and 100 Bleecker Street and 110 Bleecker Street (collectively referred to as the Silver Towers), which house NYU faculty and graduate students. The buildings were designed by modern architects James Ingo Freed and I. M. Pei, and they surround a central plaza featuring the Bust of Sylvette sculpture by Carl Nesjar and Pablo Picasso. The complex also includes the John A. Paulson Center, a multipurpose building at 181 Mercer Street that was completed in 2021. The complex's original buildings and courtyard are a New York City designated landmark.

The redevelopment of the site was first proposed in 1949; a revised proposal called Washington Square Southeast was announced in 1953. The current site of University Village was originally the southernmost of three superblocks in Washington Square Southeast and was supposed to be part of the Washington Square Village project. Due to difficulties in developing Washington Square Village, NYU bought the southernmost superblock in 1960. University Village was developed between 1964 and 1966, and tenants moved into the buildings starting in 1967. The two NYU towers were renamed the Silver Towers in 1974, after NYU alumnus Julius Silver, and the Coles Sports and Recreation Center was built on the eastern portion of the site in 1981. During the 2000s, a fourth tower was proposed as part of a wide-ranging, controversial expansion plan for NYU. The original towers and central courtyard were protected as city landmarks in 2008, and the John A. Paulson Center was developed on the Coles site between 2016 and 2022.

University Village is bounded by Houston Street to the south, Mercer Street to the east, Bleecker Street to the north, and LaGuardia Place to the west. At the center of the complex is a courtyard with Bust of Sylvette. The grounds also include various pathways and lawns. The three original brutalist–style towers are 30 stories high, with concrete facades and recessed windows; they are arranged around the courtyard in a pinwheel configuration. The towers have a combined 535 apartments, each with one to four bedrooms. The John A. Paulson Center, at the eastern end of the site, is 23 stories tall and includes a sports center, academic space, faculty apartments, and student dormitories. The original buildings won several awards when they were completed, and they have received design commentary over the years.

== Planning and construction ==
New York University (NYU) has occupied buildings near Washington Square Park since the 1830s. The university's original Washington Square building was replaced with the Silver Center in 1895, and NYU leased the Brown Building in the 1910s. After World War II, NYU sought to expand its Washington Square campus significantly. Meanwhile, the urban planner Robert Moses—who chaired the Mayor's Commission on Slum Clearance—was looking to redevelop parts of Greenwich Village by the early 1950s. At the time, at least 20 apartment houses were being built in the neighborhood, many of which were on the north side of Washington Square Park. Furthermore, as part of the Housing Act of 1949, the U.S. government could fund the redevelopment of areas that local governments had deemed "blighted".

=== Early proposals ===
==== 1949 proposal ====
In July 1949, the Mayor's Committee on Slum Clearance identified five sites across New York City that were eligible for redevelopment under the 1949 Housing Act, including a site south of Washington Square. The following year, the New York City Board of Estimate allowed the committee to request federal funds for several sites, including Washington Square South. The 40-acre (16 ha) Washington Square South site was bounded by Houston Street to the south, Sixth Avenue to the west, Third Street to the north, and Mercer Street to the east. The committee announced in January 1951 that it would seek private investors for Washington Square South and several other development sites. The Washington Square South site was to be developed in two sections, both designed by Eggers & Higgins. The portion south of Bleecker Street—the present site of University Village—would become Houston Houses, a group of eight New York City Housing Authority buildings with 900 apartments. The portion north of Bleecker Street would become Washington Square Gardens, a group of 13 privately funded apartment buildings with 1,956 apartments.

The New York Times and The American City praised the Washington Square South project's bold scale but also warned about its impact on the street grid and surrounding buildings. Local residents, on the other hand, were largely opposed to it. The Board of Estimate, which had to approve the development, postponed a decision on the site after over 100 people spoke out against it. The design journal Interiors wrote that the Washington Square South project would result in the demolition of a thriving neighborhood, and several local architects and urban planners expressed doubt about the project's necessity. Moses was initially unconcerned about the opposition, saying that it was to be expected of such a large project.

==== 1953 proposal ====
In August 1953, Moses announced a revised proposal for 2,148 apartments on a 14-acre (5.7 ha) site bounded by West Broadway (now LaGuardia Place) and Fourth, Mercer, and Houston streets. The proposal, known as Washington Square Southeast, entailed replacing 191 buildings, most of them commercial. Nine existing city blocks would have been combined into three superblocks. The northern superblock was given to NYU, becoming the site of NYU's Bobst Library, Tisch Hall, and Warren Weaver Hall. The central and southern superblocks were given to the Washington Square Village Corporation. In conjunction with the creation of the superblocks, West Broadway would have been widened and renamed "Fifth Avenue South". Though the street-widening was later dropped, the city government retained ownership of a narrow strip on the eastern side of West Broadway, facing the superblock.

Supporters of the Washington Square Southeast proposal hoped it would preserve much of Greenwich Village's character, but they were outnumbered by opponents, who argued that the site was not a blighted area. Hortense Gabel, a lawyer for 17 groups who opposed the project, requested that the Board of Estimate give them time to study the plans. The New York City Planning Commission approved Washington Square Southeast in December 1953. The same month, the federal government gave the New York City government $20 million for Washington Square Southeast and two other developments. The plan was endorsed by NYU's chancellor Henry T. Heald and the Washington Square Association. The Board of Estimate approved the plan in January 1954, at which point the city government was planning to relocate 132 families and 1,100 businesses.

Opponents fought the development for three years. In November 1954, the Board of Estimate voted to acquire 17.68 acres (7.15 ha) for Washington Square Southeast through eminent domain. An injunction preventing further land acquisition was placed in February 1955, after the city was sued by a business owner who was being displaced, but a New York Supreme Court justice dismissed the suit. The Supreme Court's Appellate Division revoked the injunction that April, and the Appellate Division upheld the Supreme Court's decision in June. A federal judge also declined to enjoin the development, and the United States House of Representatives said the plans met federal regulations. The city government sold the superblocks to NYU and the Washington Square Village Corporation that August. Washington Square Southeast's opponents appealed to the United States Court of Appeals for the Second Circuit, which upheld the city's plans in March 1956.

By mid-1956, very little work had been done toward clearing the central and southern superblocks. The City Planning Commission voted that July to rezone the Washington Square Southeast site, allowing development to proceed. In July 1957, Washington Square Village's developers announced plans for 2,004 apartments across the two superblocks. There would have been one building on the southern superblock, running between Bleecker and Houston streets, and two on the central superblock, running between Third and Bleecker streets. Paul Lester Wiener and S. J. Kessler and Sons designed these buildings, and Washington Square Village was dedicated in December 1957. The two buildings on the central superblock were completed in 1959 and 1960, but the southernmost building was never completed. The Washington Square Village Corporation canceled a planned expansion within the southern superblock in 1959. The reason for the cancellation is unclear; sources variously cite difficulties in leasing apartments, as well as the fact that the developers would have had to pay the federal government.

=== Change of plans ===
==== Proposed sale to NYU ====
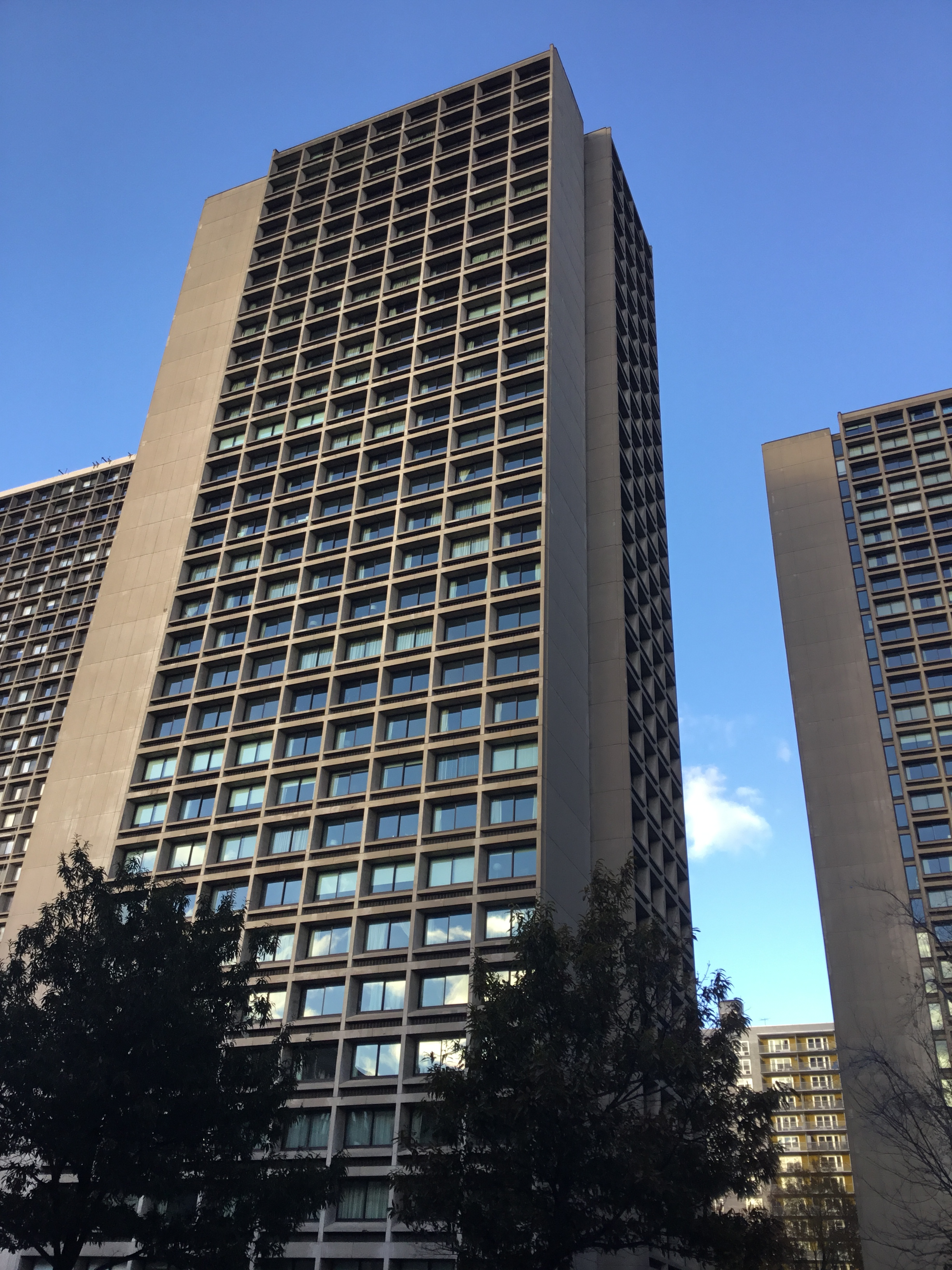
One of the towers, seen from ground level

In January 1960, NYU's president Carroll Vincent Newsom announced plans to acquire the southernmost superblock for $10.50 per square foot ($113.0/m^{2}), the same rate that the Washington Square Village Corporation had originally paid for the land. At the time, the university already owned 2.71 acres (1.10 ha) of the Washington Square Southeast site and wanted another 4 acres (1.6 ha). NYU wanted to erect either 680 or 722 apartments for faculty and married students, as well as an experimental school for student teachers. Shortly after, real-estate developers expressed skepticism about the low purchase price, claiming that private developers were willing to pay more than $10.50 per square foot. Local residents organized in opposition to NYU's plan, claiming that the site should instead be used for middle-income apartments. Leonard Farbstein, the area's U.S. representative, asked several city and state agencies not to approve the sale of the site to NYU. The backlash to the sale prompted William F. Passannante, the neighborhood's state assemblyman, to propose a bill requiring public hearings for any significant changes to slum-clearance projects in New York state.

That May, NYU announced that it would also build a 675-student experimental elementary school on part of the site. The elementary school would have been located on Houston Street, while the rest of the buildings would have been built along a west–east axis, midway between Houston and Bleecker streets. The Board of Estimate had to review the planned NYU sale, but it postponed a decision on the sale following opposition from local residents. The board scheduled several public hearings on the topic during mid-1960.

Following negotiations between NYU and local residents, the Board of Estimate approved the sale of the southern superblock in September 1960. In exchange, NYU had to build 175 or 178 middle-income apartments on the site. The apartment building was to be structured as a housing cooperative. Though anyone could apply for an apartment there, NYU would prioritize Greenwich Village residents and workers, and former residents of the site would get first preference. There would be two additional structures for NYU students and faculty. At the time, NYU faculty members had an average commute of 44 minutes. NYU did not acquire all of the land immediately, however, and the Board of Estimate gave NYU until June 1, 1961, to begin constructing the new buildings.

==== Design changes and land acquisition ====
NYU hired I. M. Pei & Associates to design the complex in December 1960. NYU had conducted over 25 interviews while searching for an architect, but I. M. Pei himself did not participate in the interview process; instead, Eason H. Leonard communicated with NYU on behalf of Pei. Although Pei contributed to the design process, his partner James Ingo Freed was the site's primary architect. NYU announced details of the three buildings in January 1961, at which point the project was known as University Village. The cooperative would contain 150 to 175 apartments, which would be rented to applicants that were selected by NYU and a set of community groups. In a manner similar to the firm's Society Hill Towers development in Philadelphia, Freed's original plan called for a curving six-story structure—inspired by brownstone residences—as well as a 19-story cooperative and a 26-story tower for NYU faculty. To preserve the low-rise character of the surrounding area, Pei & Associates wanted to place low-rise structures at the edges of the site, with the high-rises at the center. However, the presence of the co-op apartments would have required the structures at the periphery to be at least eight stories tall, twice as high as the other buildings nearby.

NYU hired the Middle Income Housing Corporation to review applications for the co-op apartments. In February 1961, the planned cooperative was downsized to 13 floors with 11 apartments each, for a total of 143 apartments. After local residents objected to the revised plan, NYU agreed to build at least 175 apartments. Even so, the New York City Housing and Redevelopment Board requested that the university add more apartments and increase their sizes, and NYU agreed in July 1961 to develop 175 co-op apartments. NYU had planned to begin constructing University Village in August 1961, and the university began clearing the site in the middle of that year. Further progress was delayed because of opposition from local residents. Two local political candidates, Ed Koch and Martin M. Berger, suggested that the University Village site be auctioned off, though the Housing and Redevelopment Board rejected that idea. The Washington Square Village Corporation also asserted that it would not sell the property to anyone else except NYU. The site plans were still pending with the Housing and Redevelopment Board in January 1962. At this point, there was to be a six-story structure for NYU, a 15-story cooperative tower with 175 apartments, and a 28-story tower for NYU faculty.

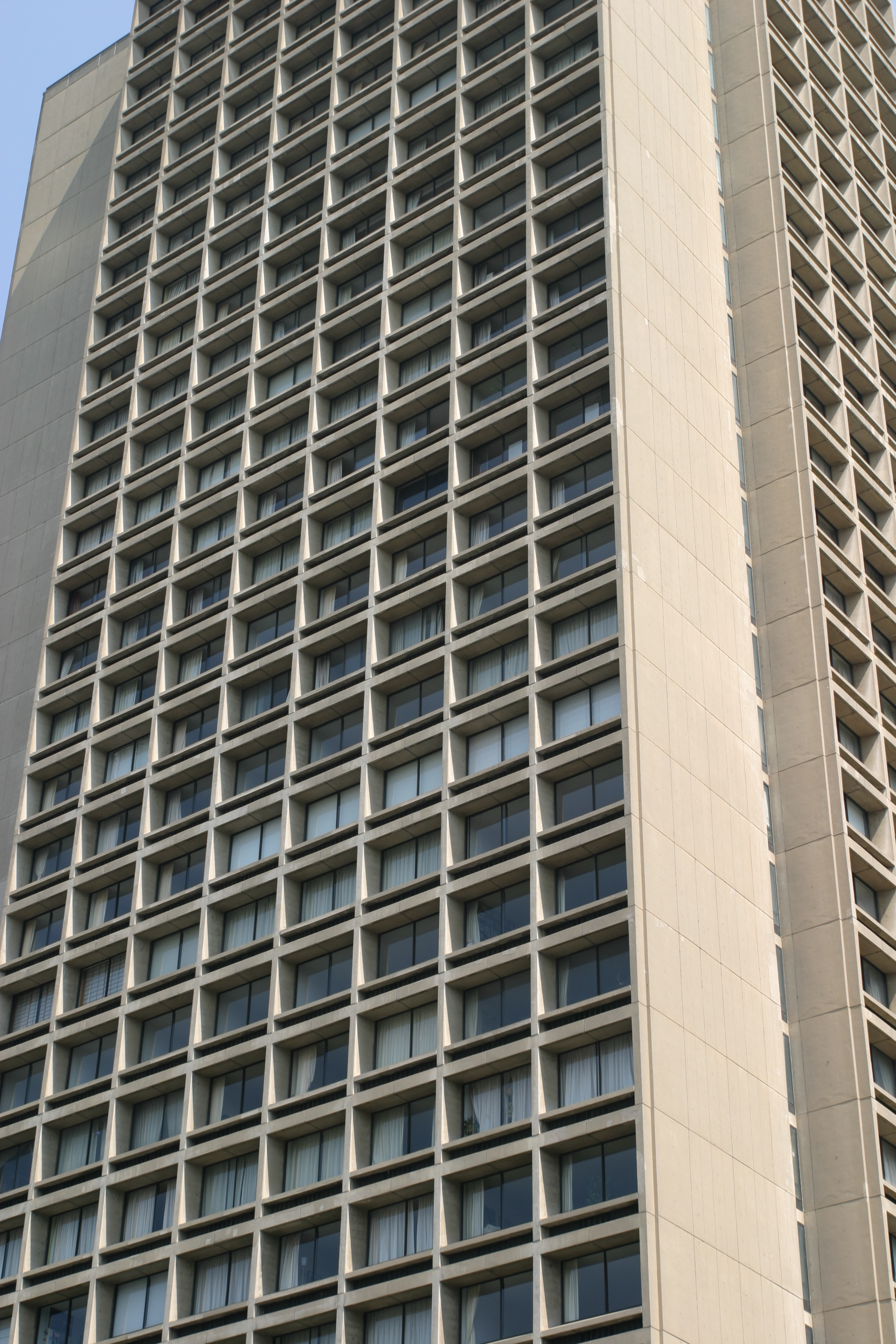
Detail of the facades

By late 1962, the plans had been changed again; the cooperative was supposed to be a seven-story building, while the two towers for NYU faculty and students would be 30 stories high. There was also supposed to be a small elementary school. NYU still did not own all the land, even though two years had passed since its initial announcement. The Board of Estimate approved the modifications in December 1962, with little opposition from local civic groups. Meanwhile, demand for NYU faculty housing continued to grow. To meet this demand, in December 1963, NYU acquired the entire Washington Square Village site, including both the southern superblock and the two buildings on the central superblock. Pei requested that the plan be altered to prevent the towers from dominating the low-rise structure. Accordingly, after the site was acquired, I. M. Pei & Associates altered the plans again, with the low-rise housing cooperative being replaced by a tower. Freed said that the development of three identical towers would save money, free up additional space, and reduce the amount of design work required. In addition, I. M. Pei & Associates believed that a set of low-rise structures would be even more out-of-place in the neighborhood.

=== Construction ===
In March 1964, I. M. Pei and Associates filed plans for two 30-story towers; one of the towers would house NYU faculty, while the other would be a housing cooperative. The towers would have concrete facades with recessed windows, and the apartments would have one to three bedrooms. The Dormitory Authority of the State of New York (DASNY) was to sell bonds to fund the faculty building's construction, while the cooperative would be funded through the Mitchell–Lama Housing Program. NYU also planned to build a third tower and a community school at a later date. Work on University Village was supposed to have begun in April 1964, but a groundbreaking ceremony did not take place until August 12, 1964. James Hester, NYU's president, said at the time that University Village was "a successful example of community cooperation".

Tishman Realty and Construction was hired to build the cooperative tower, as well as the other two apartment towers. Farkas & Barron was selected as the foundation contractor. The foundation engineers decided to construct a concrete foundation pad beneath each building, as traditional footers would have overlapped with each other. The foundation pads measure 80 by 113 feet (24 by 34 m) across and 4 feet (1.2 m) thick. To prevent the concrete from prematurely hardening, trucks poured concrete 24 hours a day; at any given time, there were at least four trucks pouring concrete, while another three trucks stood by, waiting to pour concrete. The New York Times likened the construction of the foundations to a military campaign. The Board of Estimate had not yet approved the plans for the cooperative when construction started; the plans were finally approved in November 1964, at which point the cooperative was planned to cost $4.4 million.

The building's superstructure was erected after the foundations were finished. The superstructure was constructed on a three-day cycle: The formwork was constructed on the first day, the concrete poured on the second, and the formwork removed on the third. The formwork was made of fiberglass, since that material was easy to disassemble and reuse, compared to standard plywood forms. By December 1964, the first tower had topped out. During the buildings' construction, there were disagreements over whether the new co-op should prioritize applications from the site's previous residents or applications from racial minorities. The last apartments in the cooperative building were sold in October 1965. Initially, the cooperative towers charged a monthly maintenance fee in addition to a one-time carrying charge.

== Usage ==
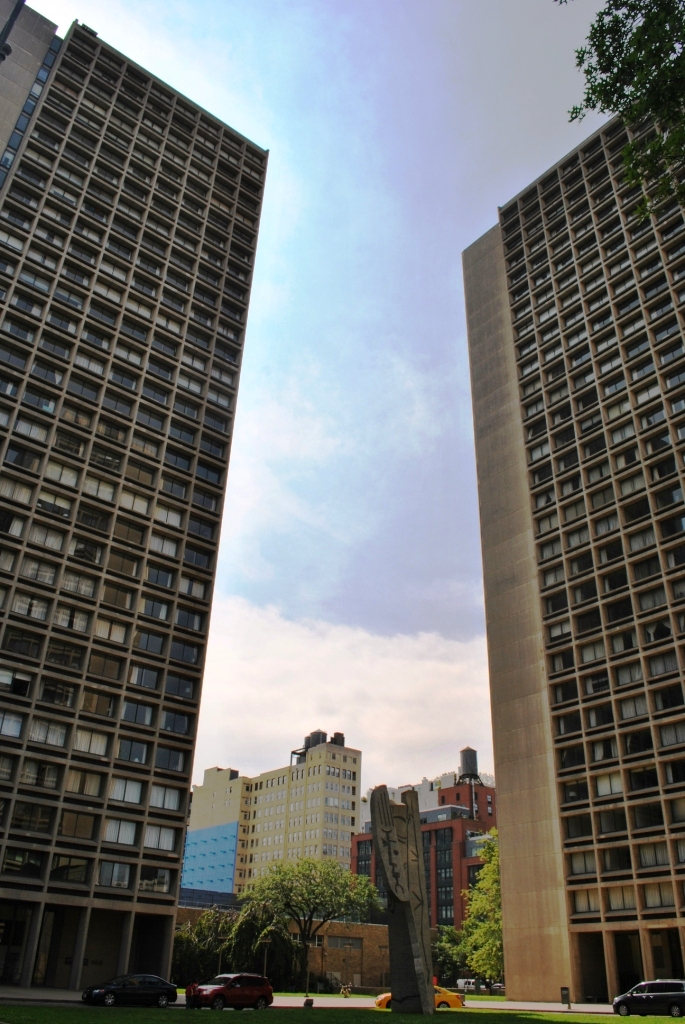
The central courtyard, with Bust of Sylvette in the center, 110 Bleecker Street at left and 505 LaGuardia Place at right

The towers were finished in late 1966, and tenants began moving into University Village in April 1967. The portion of West Broadway north of Houston Street was renamed LaGuardia Place in 1967, so the tower at 505 West Broadway became 505 LaGuardia Place. The tower at 505 LaGuardia Place became a Mitchell-Lama co-op, while the towers at 100 and 110 Bleecker Street became apartments for NYU faculty and graduate students. Among the buildings' tenants was the mobster Vincent Gigante.

=== 1960s to 1990s ===
When the complex opened, the tower at 110 Bleecker Street contained a nursery school for the children of NYU–affiliated residents. In November 1967, NYU commissioned the artist Carl Nesjar to create an enlarged version of Pablo Picasso's sculpture Bust of Sylvette for the complex's courtyard. A model of the sculpture was being displayed at the Museum of Modern Art (MoMA) at the time, and two MoMA trustees—the art collector Allan D. Emil and his wife Kate—agreed to finance the construction of a full-sized artwork. A concrete foundation pad was installed in the complex's courtyard to support the weight of the 60-short-ton (54-long-ton; 54 t) sculpture. Bust of Sylvette was dedicated on December 9, 1968.

In 1973, the architect Dan Tully submitted plans to the New York City government for a sports center just east of the University Village towers, between Mercer and Bleecker streets. The two NYU towers on Bleecker Street were renamed for Julius Silver, an NYU alumnus and donor, in 1974; several plaques about Silver's work were also installed throughout the complex. The sports center was postponed due to a lack of funding, as well as opposition from local residents who wanted to preserve University Village's dog run and playground. Plans for the sports complex were revived in 1978, at which point it was slated to cost $7 million. The sports complex became the one-story Coles Sports & Recreation Center, which opened in September 1981. Designed by Wank Adams Slavin Associates, the structure was named after Jerome Coles, a businessman who had provided over $1 million for the sports center's development.

Meanwhile, the empty lots along the site's western boundary—which had been reserved for the never-completed widening of West Broadway (LaGuardia Place)—had become overgrown by the 1970s. The Time Landscape garden was installed within one of the lots in 1978, followed by a community garden shortly thereafter. In addition, a path running diagonally from the courtyard to Bleecker Street was built at some point in the 1970s or 1980s. NYU began restoring the Bust of Sylvette sculpture in 1982, as acid rain had caused the sculpture to deteriorate. As part of a pilot program in the late 1980s, the New York City Department of Sanitation began collecting recycled bottles, cans, and papers from the two NYU towers; at the time, there was no citywide recycling program. Further repairs to the buildings' facades also took place during the late 20th century, and some lampposts were replaced.

=== 2000s to present ===
==== Landmark designation ====
NYU bought the one-story Morton Williams supermarket at the northwest corner of the site, near LaGuardia Place and Bleecker Street, in November 2000. This prompted concerns that the university would try to redevelop the site. In 2003, the Greenwich Village Society for Historic Preservation requested that the New York City Landmarks Preservation Commission (LPC) designate the entire superblock as a historic landmark. The landmark designation would have included everything on the superblock, including the three towers, the central courtyard, the supermarket, and the Coles Sports & Recreation Center. At the time, NYU wanted to redevelop the supermarket site after Morton Williams's lease expired in 2006, and it opposed the landmark designation. In 2007, NYU announced that it would expand its campus by 40 percent before 2031. NYU planned to replace the courtyard with low-rise structure with a roof garden, and it wanted to build a fourth tower on the site, which elicited local opposition,

The LPC agreed in February 2008 to host hearings on designating University Village as a city landmark. The proposed designation included only the three towers and courtyard, but local residents and preservationists wanted the supermarket and recreation center to be designated as well. The co-op board of 505 LaGuardia Place supported the potential landmark designation. NYU withdrew its previous objections, indicating that it would support the designation of the towers, but not anything else, as a landmark. Sylvette David, whose likeness had been used for the sculpture in the building's central courtyard, was among dozens of people who submitted testimony in favor of the designation. Conversely, opponents of the designation said the towers were noteworthy only because of their architect and questioned whether the development was historically notable. On November 18, 2008, the LPC designated the three towers and parts of the surrounding grounds as a city landmark.

==== Development attempts ====
NYU announced another expansion plan in early 2010. A tower would be built on the University Village site, and a "zipper building" would be built on the Coles Sports Center site. In addition, the supermarket site would become a playground, and an existing pathway through University Village would be widened. The university released renderings of University Village's 38-story tower that June. The LPC had to approve these plans, since the site was designated as a city landmark, and the city government also had to change the site's zoning to allow a hotel there. Though NYU said the new tower would preserve views from existing buildings and harmonize with the designs of Pei's towers, local residents criticized it extensively. In addition to general opposition over the size of the structures, there were objections to the relocation of University Village's dog run and the loss of recreational space. NYU submitted an application to the LPC that October, requesting permission to construct the fourth tower, but NYU canceled the planned tower the next month. Instead, NYU sought to redevelop the supermarket site.

As part of the NYU 2031 plan, announced in 2011, NYU proposed a mixed-use hotel and dormitory on the site of the Coles Recreation Center, as well as a 14-story school and dormitory building on the supermarket site. In April 2012, NYU scaled down its plans; the proposed 14-story tower was reduced to a seven-story public school. The New York City Council overwhelmingly approved NYU 2031 that July, prompting opponents to sue the city two months later. Concurrently, the co-op board of 505 LaGuardia Place leased that tower from NYU for $28,400 a year, but the co-op board's lease was about to expire, which meant that the structure could have been converted into market rate housing. NYU agreed in mid-2012 to extend the co-op board's lease indefinitely, allowing that building to remain in use as affordable housing.

In January 2014, New York Supreme Court judge Donna Mills issued an injunction blocking much of the NYU 2031 plan, citing the fact that part of the superblock could be considered parkland because it had been used for that purpose for so long. Mills's ruling did not apply to a dog run on Mercer Street, next to the Coles Recreation Center, which was slated to be demolished. NYU appealed Mills's ruling, and the New York Supreme Court, Appellate Division, overturned the decision that October, ruling that the sites were not legally parkland. The New York Court of Appeals. the state's highest court, approved the expansion in June 2015.

==== Redevelopment of the block ====
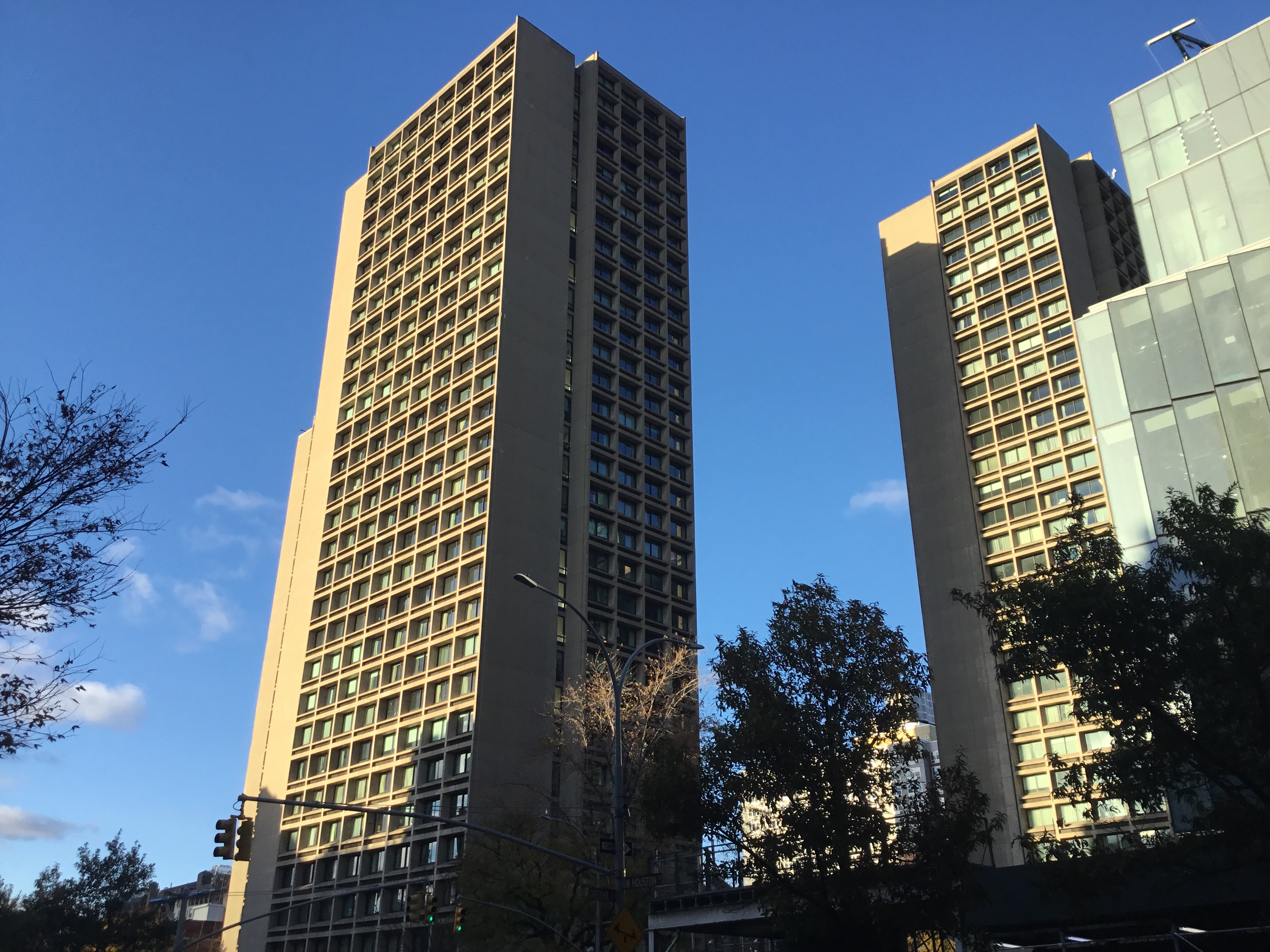
The complex as seen from Houston Street near Greene Street. The Paulson Center is visible at the far right.

NYU hired the architectural firms Davis Brody Bond and KieranTimberlake to design a new building on the superblock's eastern end in December 2014. The Coles Sports Center was closed in February 2016 as part of the NYU 2031 plan. Demolition of the Coles Sports Center began in mid-2016, and NYU filed plans for a 588,000-square-foot (54,600 m^{2}), 23-story building at 181 Mercer Street the same October. NYU published renderings of the building that December. Construction of that building began in 2017, and NYU dedicated the structure at 181 Mercer Street in December 2022. The structure was named the John A. Paulson Center, in recognition of a $100 million gift from the hedge fund magnate John Paulson, and cost $1.2 billion in total.

Meanwhile, there were also plans to redevelop the Morton Williams supermarket at 130 Bleecker Street, at the northwestern corner of University Village. The city government had agreed to give the Morton Williams site to NYU if a supermarket had been built within 181 Mercer Street, but the Paulson Center had been built without space for a supermarket. The New York City School Construction Authority announced plans in December 2021 to build a school for special-needs students at 130 Bleecker Street, prompting protests from local residents. By mid-2023, the city planned to build a regular public school and supermarket at 130 Bleecker Street. Following continued opposition to the site's redevelopment, NYU and the city agreed in December 2023 to allow the supermarket to operate for another 13 years.

== Description ==
The University Village complex is in the Greenwich Village neighborhood of Manhattan in New York City, two blocks south of Washington Square Park. The site is bounded by Houston Street to the south, Mercer Street to the east, Bleecker Street to the north, and LaGuardia Place (formerly known as West Broadway) to the west. It occupies two tax lots. The site occupies a superblock that was created through the formation of three smaller city blocks.

The original portion of the complex consists of three 30-story concrete towers: 505 LaGuardia Place to the west, 100 Bleecker Street to the east, and 110 Bleecker Street to the south. The complex is an example of a "towers in the park" design, as the towers are arranged in a pinwheel plan around a 100-foot-square (30 m) courtyard. The grounds also include a playground and a sitting area, in addition to a dog run and community garden. At the northwestern corner of the grounds is a Morton Williams supermarket at 130 Bleecker Street, while at the eastern end of the complex is the mixed-use John A. Paulson Center at 181 Mercer Street. Until the Coles Sports and Recreation Center was razed in 2016, it stood at the eastern end of the complex. Both the recreation center and the supermarket were built as low-rise structures and were constructed separately from the rest of the complex.

=== Paths, lawns, and open space ===
The University Village site is crossed by several paths, which run north–south and west–east relative to the local street grid; the grid is oriented so that the site's northwest corner actually faces geographically north. The pathways were originally illuminated by metal lampposts, each topped by five globe-shaped bulbs. A small number of the original lampposts remain intact, while the rest of the pathways on the grounds are illuminated by U-shaped lampposts, topped by rectangular lamps. Two south–north streets, Wooster Street to the west and Greene Street to the east, were closed to traffic when the buildings were constructed. The street's rights of way remain intact, and a driveway runs along the route of Wooster Street. The landscaping along the site's borders was intended to reduce the contrast between the towers and the low-rise buildings south of it.

==== Wooster Street and courtyard ====
University Village
1 505 LaGuardia Place
2 110 Bleecker Street (surrounded by south-central lawn)
3 100 Bleecker Street
4 181 Mercer Street—NYU Paulson Center
5 Courtyard
6 North lawn
7 East lawn, seating area and playground
8 505 LaGuardia garden

The driveway along Wooster Street is paved in granite blocks. It runs north–south through the western third of the site, separating the 505 LaGuardia Place tower to the west and the Silver Towers to the east. A three-sided granite-block driveway splits off to the east of Wooster Street, providing access to both of the Silver Towers. The three-sided path forms the north, east, and south sides of a square-shaped courtyard, while Wooster Street forms the courtyard's western border. The central courtyard has a grass turf with rounded corners, and there are concrete pavers with metal drains at each of the rounded corners. Both of the roads surrounding the courtyard have concrete curbs, and the western curb of Wooster Street and the outside curb of the driveway have cylindrical concrete bollards. There are also a low concrete bench and two metal flagpoles along the northern leg of the driveway, as well as a plaque between the flagpoles, with text about the buildings' history.

===== Bust of Sylvette sculpture =====
In the central courtyard is a cubist sculpture called Bust of Sylvette, which measures 36 feet (11 m) high and weighs 60 short tons (54 long tons; 54 t). It was sculpted by the Norwegian artist Carl Nesjar in 1968 based on a design by Pablo Picasso, who had created a 2-foot-high (0.61 m) folded-metal version of the sculpture in 1954. Pei first become acquainted with Nesjar in 1958, when Nesjar showed Pei some of his betograve artworks (in which concrete was sandblasted to create different textures). Bust of Sylvette was the second outdoor sculpture by Picasso to be built in the Western Hemisphere, following the unnamed sculpture at Chicago's Richard J. Daley Center.

The sculpture is 20 feet (6.1 m) long at its widest point, and it is carved out of a slab measuring 12.5 inches (320 mm) thick. The figure is a sculpture in-the-round of the head, neck, and shoulders of a woman named Sylvette David, who is depicted with a pigtail. The sculpture includes black-stone basalt pebbles imported from Norway. Before the basalt pebbles were added to the sculpture, they were placed in watertight wooden boxes, which were then shaken to ensure that there were as few air pockets as possible. The spaces between the basalt were then filled with cement grout, and the resulting aggregate was then coated with in buff-colored cement. Parts of the cement are engraved, revealing pieces of the aggregate beneath it.

Bust of Sylvette was originally intended for Kips Bay Towers, which Pei had also designed; however, Kips Bay Towers' developer William Zeckendorf had rejected the piece. Early drawings for Society Hill in Philadelphia indicate that a similar artwork was also planned for that development, though the piece was never executed there. In addition to serving as a lawn decoration, the sculpture was intended to emphasize University Village's pinwheel layout. A further plan by Christo and Jeanne-Claude in 1972 to wrap the sculpture in brown fabric was never completed.

==== West of Wooster Street ====
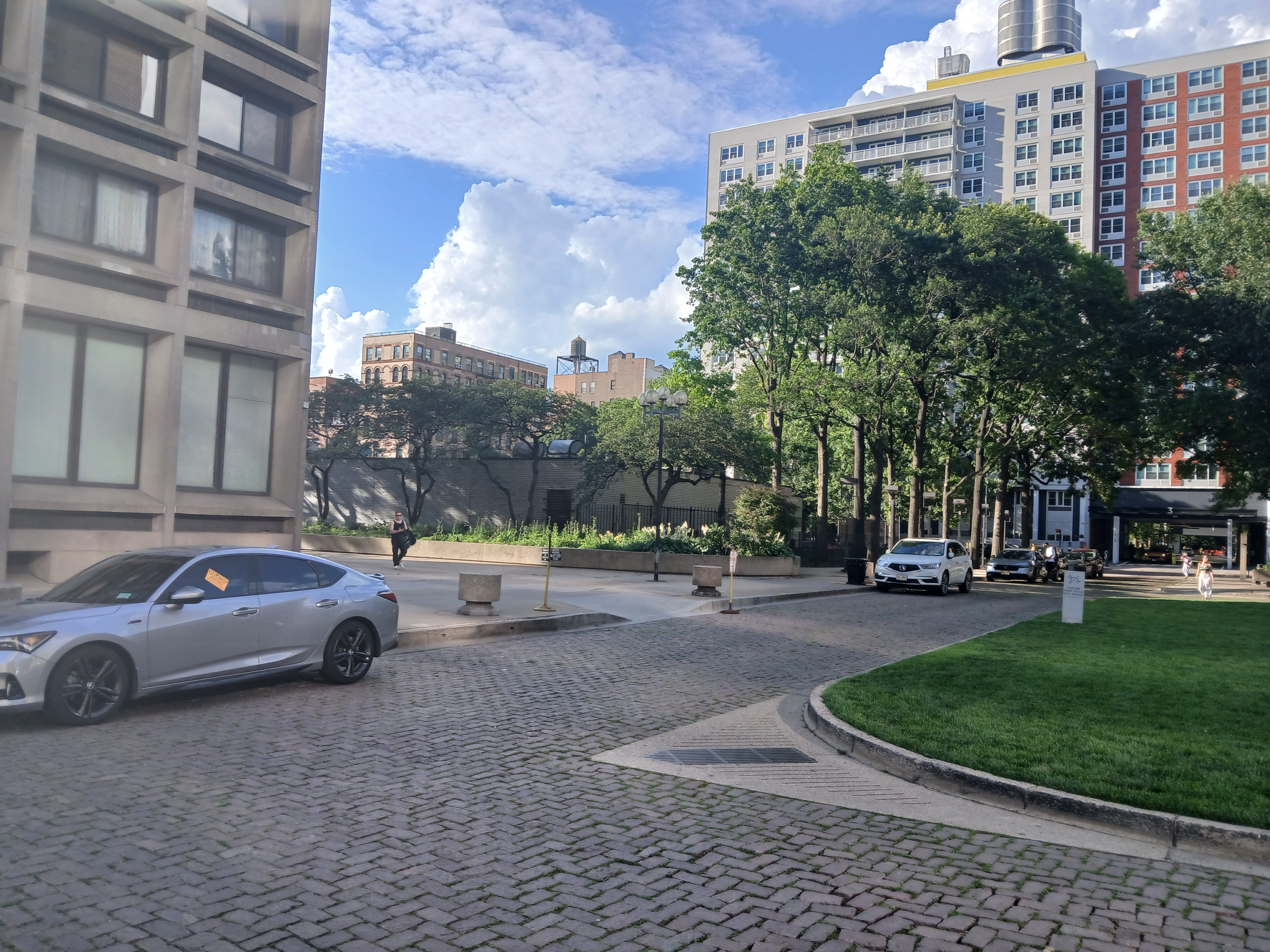
Northwest view of Wooster Street from 100 Bleecker Street. 505 LaGuardia Place is visible at west.

A walkway runs along the western side of the site; it is separated from LaGuardia Place's eastern sidewalk by the Time Landscape garden and the LaGuardia Corner Gardens. Both gardens occupy a strip of land that was supposed to be used for the never-realized widening of West Broadway. Time Landscape, a piece of landscape architecture created in 1978 by Alan Sonfist, is an urban forest composed of trees and vegetation native to the New York City area. The landscape occupies a 25-by-40-foot (7.6 by 12.2 m) plot on the southwest corner of University Village, near the intersection of LaGuardia Place and Houston Street. The original plantings consisted of about 300 grasses, trees, shrubs, and other plants, as well as soil from construction sites in Lower Manhattan. The LaGuardia Corner Gardens is located at the northwest corner of University Village, near the intersection of LaGuardia Place and Bleecker Street. This site has operated as a community garden since 1981 and includes plants such as lavender, roses, and apple groves.

Just north of 505 LaGuardia, a concrete stairway ascends east of the western walkway, connecting to a west–east path that continues to Wooster Street. On the northern side of the west–east path, there is a metal bench, planting bed, and a concrete wall with a metal fence. There is also a private garden on the south side of 505 LaGuardia, with a steel fence around it.

==== East of Wooster Street ====
There are three lawns east of Wooster Street. Along Bleecker Street is the north lawn, which runs between Wooster Street and the eastern boundary of 100 Bleecker. There are lamps and trees within the north lawn, as well as a concrete path that runs diagonally from the Bleecker Street sidewalk to 100 Bleecker. The east lawn is next to 100 Bleecker and includes a concrete path that runs north–south between Bleecker and Houston streets. There is a set of curved concrete benches at the southeast corner of the original site, south of 100 Bleecker and east of 110 Bleecker. Immediately south of the benches is a playground. The south-central lawn wraps around 110 Bleecker, with a fence on all sides except the north side; a chain-link fence separates the south-central lawn from the playground.

=== Silver Towers and 505 LaGuardia Place ===
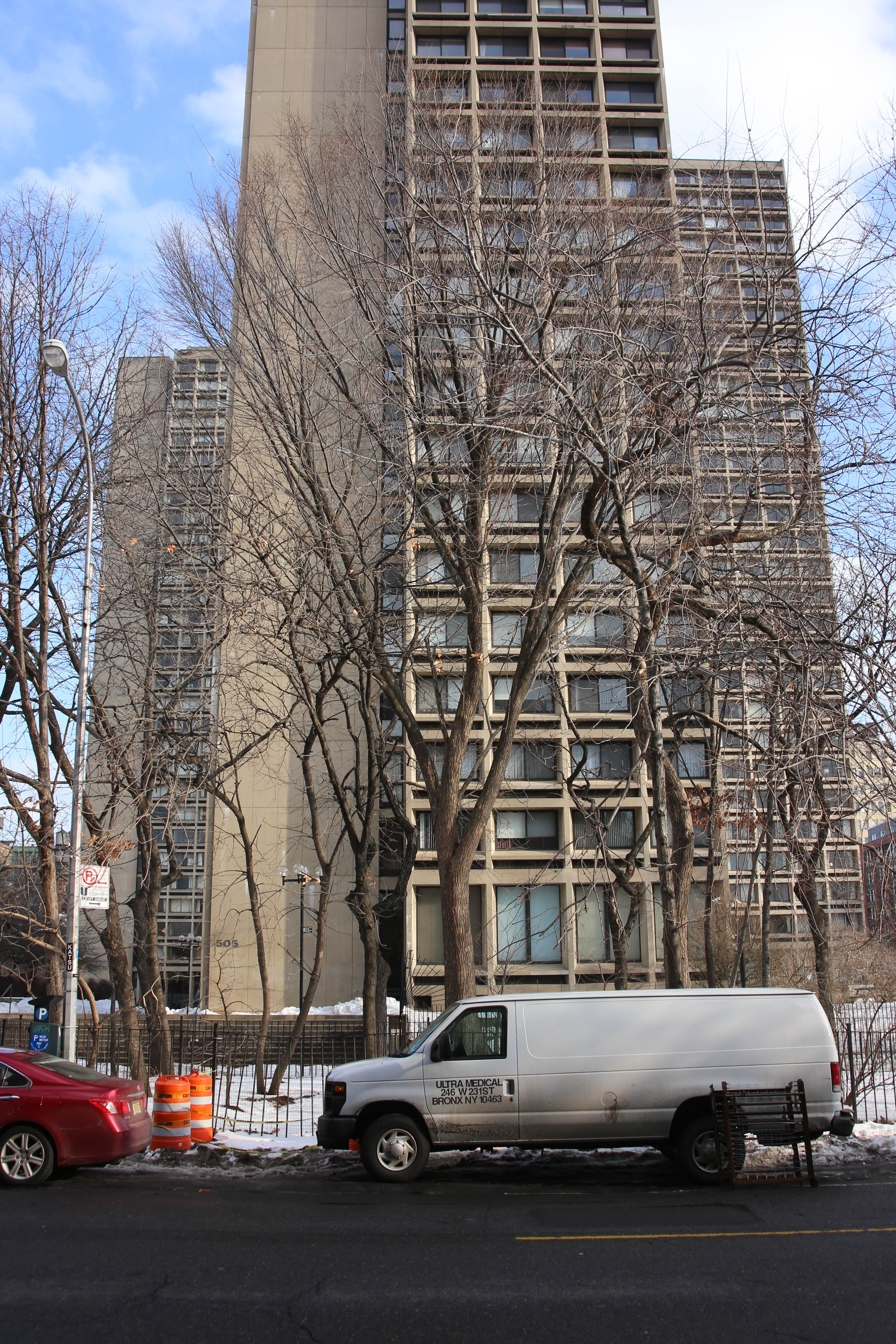
Looking east from LaGuardia Place. In the foreground is the narrower elevation of 505 LaGuardia Place, which is four bays wide. There is an additional bay of smaller windows on the left side of the facade, as well as a plain-concrete shear wall to the left.

The three original brutalist–style towers were designed by I. M. Pei & Associates, with James Ingo Freed as the architect in charge. Tishman Realty & Construction was the general contractor. Farkas & Barron was the foundation contractor, and Caretsky & Associates were the mechanical and electrical engineers. The towers sit on a raised platform, which is about 10 feet (3.0 m) higher than the ground at the southern end of the site. 110 Bleecker faces north, while the other two towers face west; all three towers are placed asymmetrically about the courtyard. All three buildings face away from Houston Street to the south, which, at the time of the buildings' construction, functioned as an arterial road instead of a city street. The arrangement is similar to Kips Bay Towers, where each tower in the complex is arranged in different directions, and contrasts with the two original Washington Square Village buildings, which are parallel to one another. At the time of the buildings' construction, Pei believed that a city should be composed of "a sequence of spaces enclosed and defined by buildings".

The structures occupy less than one-third of the site. There are parking garages under the three towers. The garages are accessed by two ramps from Houston Street. The western ramp (between LaGuardia Place and Wooster Street) serves 505 LaGuardia, while the eastern ramp (between Wooster and Greene streets) serves the Silver Towers. Both ramps have a single sidewalk and are flanked by concrete walls; the walls next to the western ramp are topped by steel fences, while the walls next to the eastern ramp are topped by steel tubes.

==== Facades ====
Each tower's exterior is made of cast-in-place reinforced concrete, since Pei preferred to use that material. The texture and color of the concrete was intended to approximate that of limestone. Depending on how much light they received, the facades had the appearance of either limestone or sandstone. Each tower rises straight from the ground without any setbacks. The towers have a roughly rectangular plan as seen from above. All of the windows have aluminum frames, and the windows are deeply recessed, which was intended both to emphasize the gridded facades and reduce solar gain. The wider elevations of each tower are divided into a grid measuring eight bays wide, while the narrower elevations are only four bays wide.

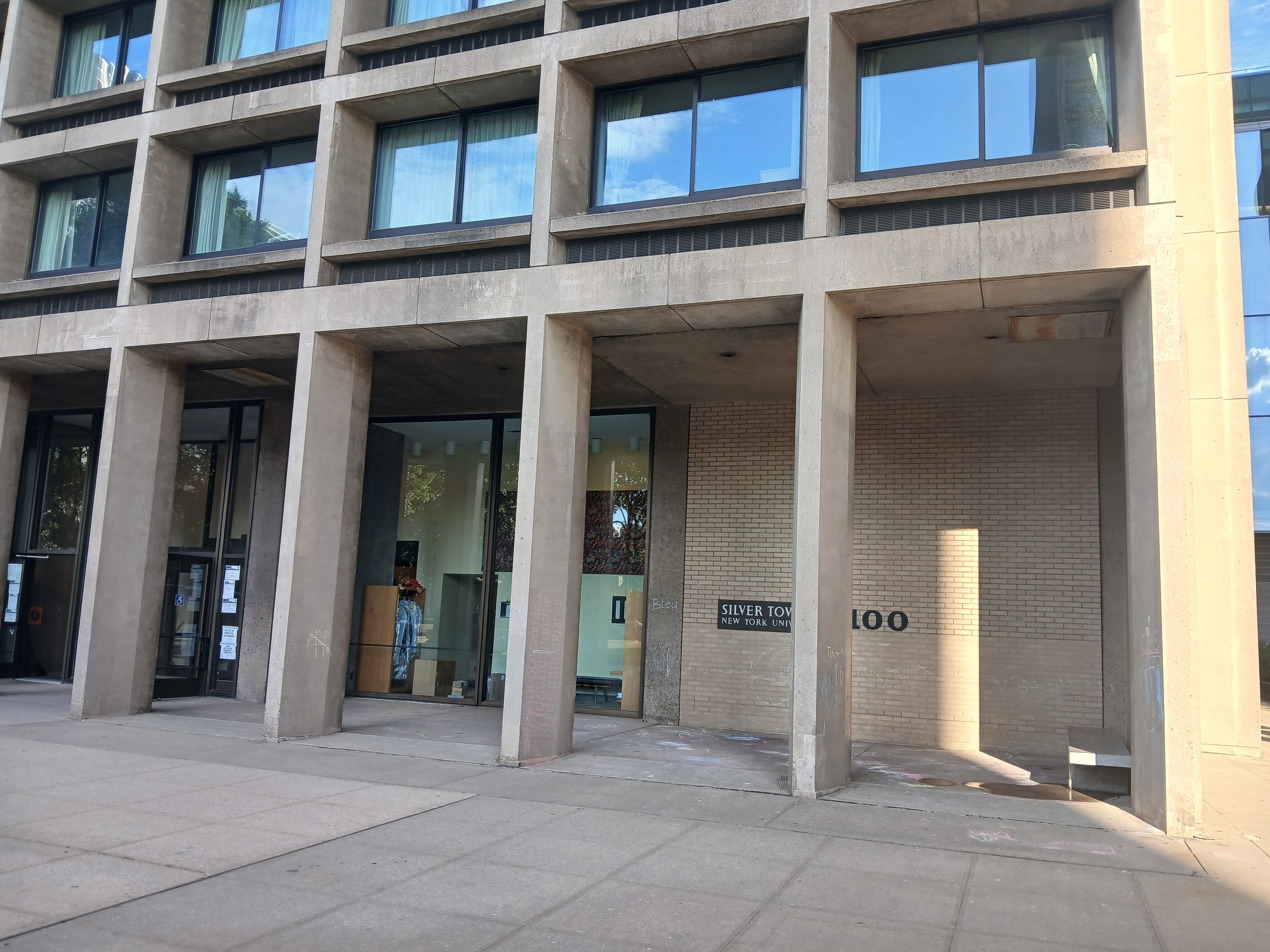
The first-story entrances of each building are recessed significantly from the facade, creating arcades in front of these entrances.

At each building's basement level, the openings are filled with louvers rather than windows. The openings on the ground, or first, story of each building are significantly taller than those on the upper stories. The first-story entrances are recessed significantly from the facade, creating arcades in front of these entrances. 505 LaGuardia's arcade faces the pathway to its north, while the other two buildings' arcades are located on the central courtyard. The arcade at 505 LaGuardia has a cement pavement, brick walls at either end of the arcade, a service entrance on one side, and recessed ceiling lamps. That building's primary entrance is through a set of double glass doors flanking a set of plate-glass windows. The entrances to 100 Bleecker and 110 Bleecker are similar in design to that at 505 LaGuardia. However, these buildings' plate-glass windows are larger and are protected by metal strips, and the arcades in the Bleecker Street buildings have granite benches (which are missing from 505 LaGuardia's arcade). In all three buildings, the rest of the first floor contains large windows. In addition, there are raised digits outside each building's entrance, which bear that building's address number. Early plans called for arcades on all four sides of each tower, but that idea was rejected.

On each of the upper floors, each rectangular bay contains a pair of windows above a narrow aluminum grille. There is an extra bay of smaller windows near the left end of each elevation. To the left of this bay, each elevation has a plain-concrete shear wall rising from the ground to the roof, which measures 22 feet (6.7 m) wide. When the buildings were constructed, Pei described the plain shear walls as "packages of space", which helped separate the gridded facades on the different elevations. To permit thermal expansion, all three buildings' facades contain horizontal joints between each floor and vertical joints at the center of each bay. The joints divide each of the columns into roughly "T"-shaped pieces. The structures' heating, ventilation, and air conditioning systems are embedded into the facades. 505 LaGuardia is topped by a water tower as well, though the other two towers lack this feature.

==== Interiors ====
The interiors of the three buildings are very similar, with minor differences in the lobbies and interior finishes. The NYU buildings have wooden floors, built-in curtains, and built-in air conditioners, while the co-op building has tile floors and lacks built-in air-conditioners or curtains. The corridors at the center of each building are short and compact, compared with other dormitory buildings that have winding corridors. In addition, the floors are arranged so that each apartment's doorway leads into a small foyer, rather than directly into a living room. There are staircases and elevators leading off the corridors. The apartments are separated by thick soundproof walls. The interior partitions within each apartment are engineered so that they do not crack due to thermal expansion, which is common in other concrete structures.

When the Bleecker Street buildings and 505 LaGuardia Place were completed, they consisted of 535 apartments. In all three buildings, each floor contains six apartments. Most floors are divided evenly into one-, two-, and three-bedroom apartments, with two of each type per floor. All of the two- and three-bedroom apartments occupy the buildings' corners, with windows on at least two elevations of the building. The kitchens of these apartments have small window openings next to each building's shear walls. The early plans called for one apartment on each of the narrower elevations and two apartments on each of the wider elevations; every apartment would have had a room facing the buildings' shear walls. However, this layout was not possible because the Mitchell-Lama program imposed certain restrictions on apartment layouts. In each building, there is a different apartment layout every five floors; these stories contain three one-bedroom apartments, as well as one apartment each with two, three, and four bedrooms.

=== 181 Mercer Street ===
The structure at 181 Mercer Street was designed by Davis Brody Bond and KieranTimberlake. 181 Mercer Street is connected to the original towers via a walkway. It is composed of 23-story twin towers with glass facades, as well as 735,000 square feet (68,300 m^{2}) of floor space. The structure is divided into a five-story podium and an 18-story upper section. The facade is composed of curtain wall panels measuring 4.5 feet (1.4 m) wide and 10 to 20 feet (3.0 to 6.1 m) tall. To reduce the chance of bird strikes, there are fritted glass panels on several parts of the facade. The facade also has protruding wedge-shaped modules, which were intended to reduce solar gain and bird strikes while increasing visibility from inside. In addition, the podium is coated with low emissivity film, while the upper 18 stories are coated with a thicker film that deflects more infrared and ultraviolet light.

The building's basements extend under part of the former right-of-way of Greene Street. There is a sports center in the basement, with a lap pool, four basketball courts, and several smaller rooms for other sports. The podium includes academic spaces. The upper stories include three theaters (including the 350-seat Iris Cantor Proscenium Theatre and two black box theaters), along with several other performance spaces and 58 classrooms. In addition, there is a commons space. On the sixth floor is a lobby for the upper-story rooms and includes a takeout-dining cafe and an outdoor terrace. There are some study rooms, kitchens, and lounges on the seventh and eighth stories. The upper stories include 42 faculty apartments and 400 beds for freshman students. The student dormitories and faculty apartments are placed in separate towers; the dorms are sparsely decorated, while the faculty apartments have more elaborate finishes and contain two to three bedrooms each. The hallways and stairways are placed next to the perimeter of the building.

== Reception ==
=== Commentary ===
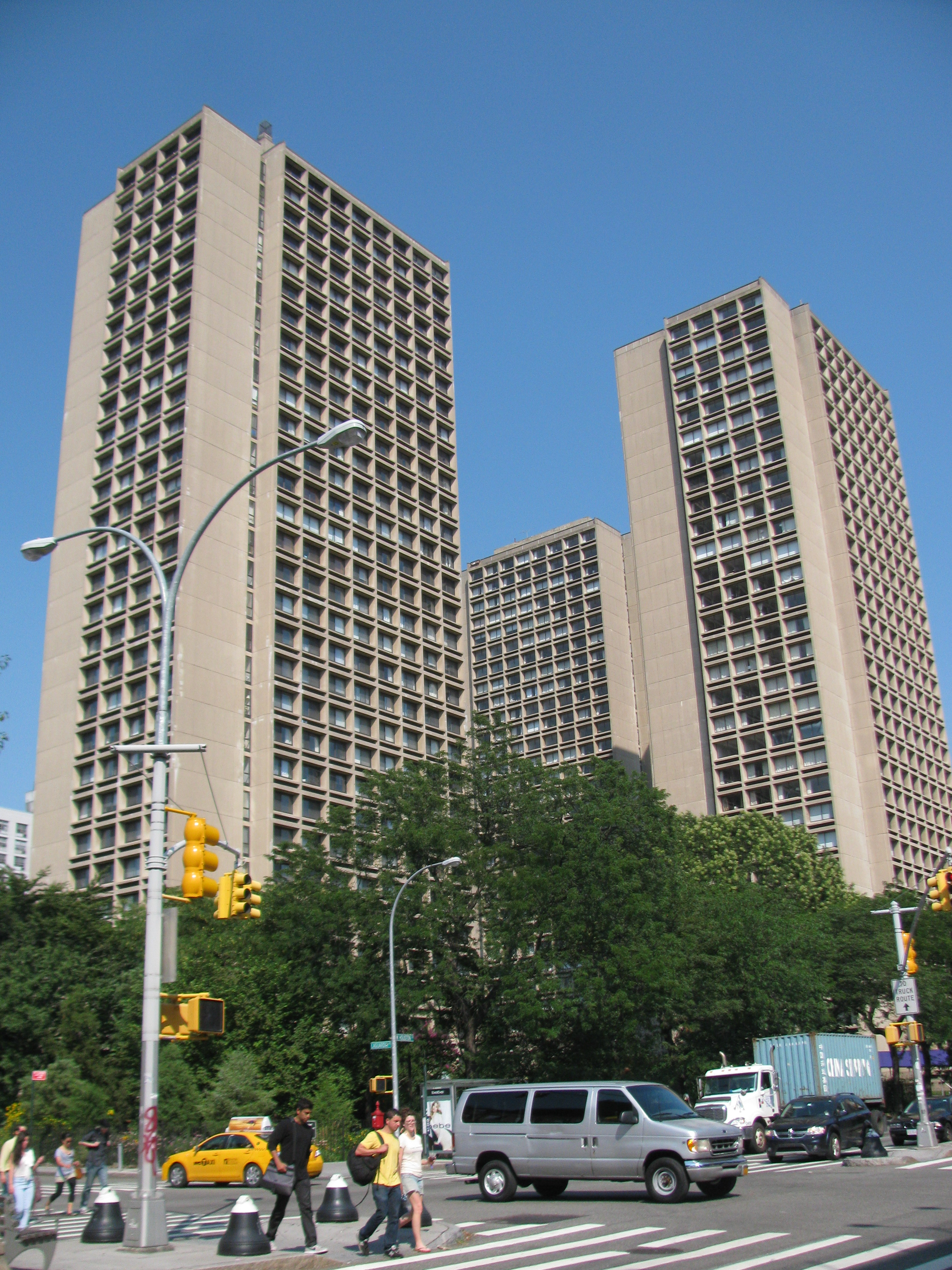
The complex as seen from Houston Street near West Broadway

During University Village's construction, the New York Herald Tribune described the early plans as being architecturally distinctive, while Glenn Fowler of The New York Times described the structures as controversial because of their large scale. When University Village was completed, Architectural Forum magazine described the buildings as "among the most handsome recent additions to the New York townscape". According to Architectural Forum, while Pei's other buildings were generally overscaled compared with their surroundings, the University Village structures had "several elements carefully graduated in size", giving the buildings a more human scale. The American Institute of Architects (AIA) said of the structures: "The arrangement of three towers is well handled both for itself and its urban neighborhood." Public reception of the complex was less positive: AmNewYork Metro retrospectively described the site in 2004 as a "much-loathed superblock".

Largely positive acclaim continued after the buildings were completed. Paul Goldberger wrote in 1979 that the buildings were distinctive because of the facades' "rhythm and texture", and John Tauranac wrote the same year that the buildings' facades and massing made them stand out to both passersby and residents. Robert A. M. Stern wrote in his 1995 book New York 1960 that the buildings' arrangement and facades gave them a dynamic yet human-scaled quality, while Eric Nash praised the buildings' energetic ambiance in his 1999 book Manhattan Skyscrapers. Herbert Muschamp of The New York Times wrote that University Village was one of the city's few towers-in-the-park complexes that "contributed to the rich diversity of the cityscape". When Freed died in 2005, Museum of Modern Art curator Terence Riley said the University Village complex was among Manhattan's "most refined examples of modern design". Conversely, Francis Morrone, in a 2001 guidebook of New York City architecture, wrote that University Village was the best-looking structure on the border between Greenwich Village and SoHo, although he said that was "not saying much" because the structures in that area were so ugly.

When the buildings were being considered for landmark status, The Architect's Newspaper wrote in 2008 that the buildings were "an unusually urbane case of urban renewal", and the architectural critic Carter Horsley wrote the same year that the complex was one of Pei's "watershed" designs. A reporter for The Globe and Mail wrote in 2009 that, even though the towers initially looked like unassuming concrete buildings, "there is much more than meets the eye", citing the towers' deep windows, "visual thoroughfares", and pedestrian-oriented design features. The writer Edward R. Ford said that the complex merited preservation because it was a good example of "a view of the city that has been discredited".

There has also been commentary about the Bust of Sylvette sculpture in the building's courtyard. When the sculpture was announced, Time magazine dubbed it "half as high and twice as sexy as the Great Sphinx of Egypt". The sculpture received a New York State Award from the New York State Council on the Arts in 1969. Seth Kugel wrote for the Times in 2006 that Bust of Sylvette was "almost certainly better art than that in most NYU dorm rooms".

=== Awards ===
The buildings won several awards when they were completed. In 1966, the complex was listed as one of Fortune magazine's "Ten Buildings That Climax an Era" and received an award from the Concrete Industry Board. The next year, the buildings received the City Club of New York's Albert S. Bard Award and the AIA's National Honor Award. The New York chapter of the AIA included the building in an exhibit of the city's historic buildings in 1967, and the chapter's Environments Awards Exhibition gave University Village its Street Lighting Award in 1969. When Pei won the Pritzker Architecture Prize in 1983, University Village was cited as one of his major works. Upon the buildings' 30th anniversary, in 1996, Robert A. M. Stern included University Village in his list of "35 Modern Landmarks-in-Waiting".

== See also ==
- List of New York City Designated Landmarks in Manhattan below 14th Street
