= Sylvette =

Sculpture by Pablo Picasso and Carl Nesjar

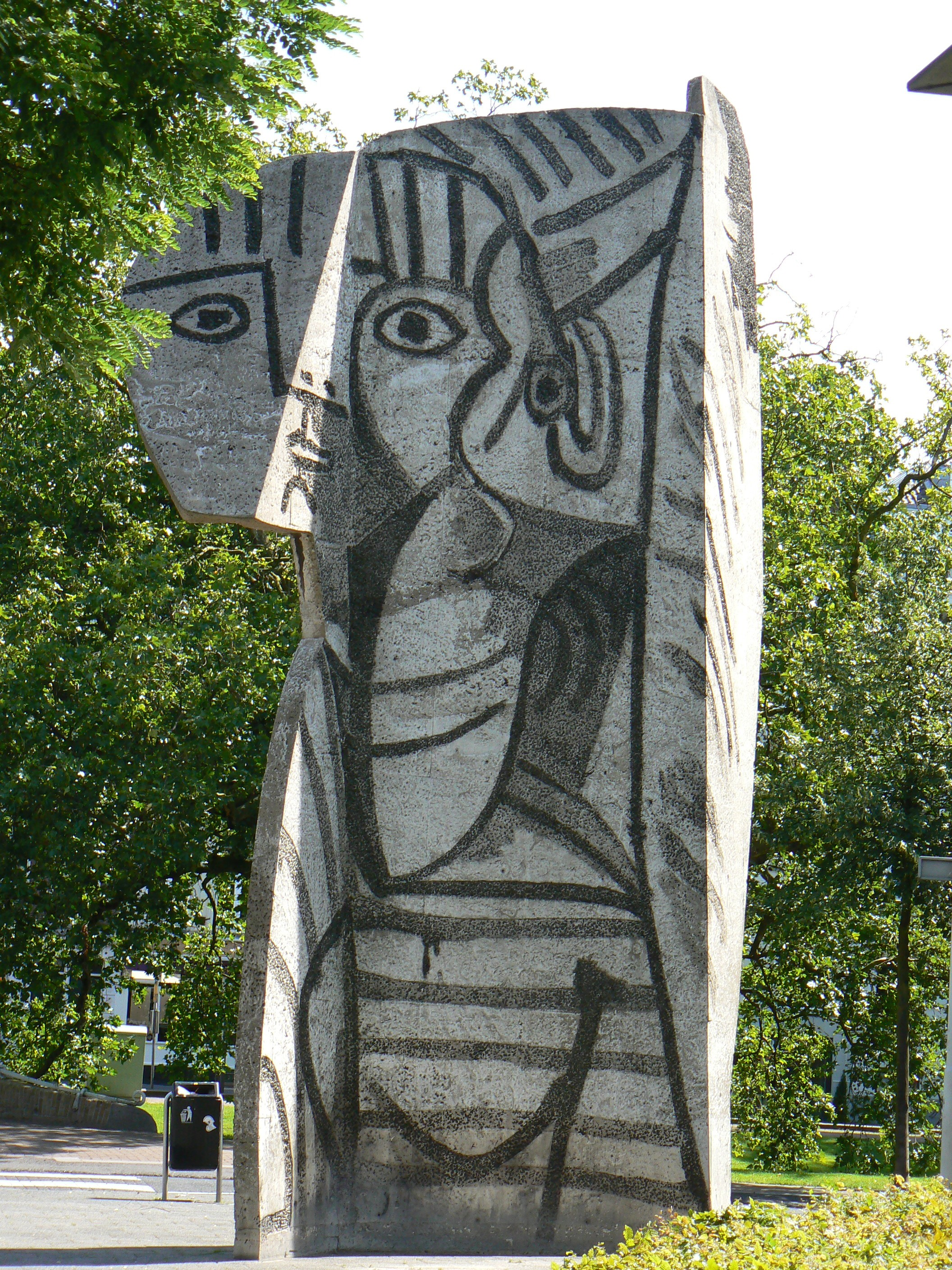
- Artist: Pablo Picasso, Carl Nesjar
- Year: 1970
- Medium: Concrete
- Location: Westersingel, Rotterdam

Sylvette is a large concrete sculpture created by Pablo Picasso and the Norwegian artist Carl Nesjar, which was erected in the city of Rotterdam in 1970. It is located on the corner of Westersingel next to the Museum Boijmans Van Beuningen. The sculpture portrays a young woman with a ponytail. The model for the sculpture was Sylvette David, whom Picasso met in 1953 when she was 19. The sculpture was produced following the creation of a series of artworks, known as the Sylvette series, that Picasso made of his muse in a variety of artistic styles.

== Background ==
Sylvette David was the daughter of a Parisian art dealer who, during the summer of 1953, met 73-year-old Picasso at his pottery studio located on Rue du Fournas in Vallauris. Finding her appearance appealing, Picasso asked her to be his model and subsequently created 60 works inspired by her over the course of two months (between April and June), including drawings, paintings and small metal sculptures. This was the most concentrated series of works that Picasso produced of a model in his lifetime. Life magazine described this era as Picasso's "Ponytail Period". Sylvette possessed the classic features that Picasso admired with blonde hair tied in a high ponytail. Within this series of artworks, Picasso depicted his model in numerous styles, including both naturalistic and cubist images.

In 1957, Picasso met Carl Nesjar and was impressed with a process that he had invented for producing large concrete sculptures. They began to collaborate on producing a series of artworks, which began with Nesjar transferring Picasso's designs onto three murals on a government building in Oslo. The managing director of the Bijenkorf department store, Van der Wal, who was a member of the Urban Embellishment Committee, was impressed and wanted to install a similar artwork in Rotterdam. Initially, the committee proposed the installation of a 12 metre high sculpture by Picasso in Kralingse Hout, a greenbelt area northeast of Rotterdam, but it was withdrawn due to negative public opinion. Another artwork proposed by Picasso was again rejected in 1967, three years before the current sculpture was erected in 1970.

== Description ==
The Sylvette sculpture in Rotterdam is a smaller version of the similarly constructed Bust of Sylvette in New York, both being larger versions of several small sculptures that Picasso created using painted sheet metal. It measures 7.5 m (nearly 25 ft) in height and was erected in May 1970. The sculpture was originally located in front of the Building Centre in Rotterdam, but following renovations in the area, it was moved to its current location on the corner of Westersingel next to the Museum Boijmans Van Beuningen on 24-25 March 2003. It was cast in concrete with black pebbles, using a technique called "concrete sgraffito", which was developed by Picasso's friend, Carl Nesjar. The process involved Picasso painting the original sculpture with lines, which were then copied onto the concrete by Nesjar by sandblasting the surface to reveal the black pebbles. The resulting effect mimicked the hand painted lines on the original sculpture.

== Reception ==
The sculpture was bought by the city of Rotterdam in 1963, however, its installation proved to be unpopular with local residents and artists, who protested for eight years, until it was finally erected in 1970. The Rotterdam artist community was of the opinion that the value of the artwork should have been spent on locally produced art, which further tarnished the reputation of the sculpture. The popularity of the sculpture has since improved with locals and tourists alike.

== Significance and legacy ==
Christoph Grunenberg, director of the Kunsthalle Bremen in Germany, remarked on the ground-breaking nature of Picasso's portraits of Sylvette. "Suddenly, Picasso goes back to sheet metal, which he had used in his Cubist assemblage Guitar [1914], but now he uses it in a very innovative way. You get this interesting dialogue between painting and sculpture: they [the folded-metal sculptures] are almost cut out of the canvas, which then becomes three dimensional."

Sculpture International Rotterdam opines that the Sylvette series, "reveal his mastery as a painter and are evidence that even at an advanced age he was still capable of reinventing himself. Moreover, the series illustrate how Picasso was able to approach one motif in various naturalistic and Cubist styles." The works had widespread impact on a younger generation in the 1950s, with high ponytails becoming particularly popular in Paris during this time. In summary, the Sylvette series, "made modern art more accessible and Picasso’s work more understandable".

== See also ==
- Chicago Picasso
- Picasso's Regjeringskvartalet murals
