= Betograve =

Sculpting technique

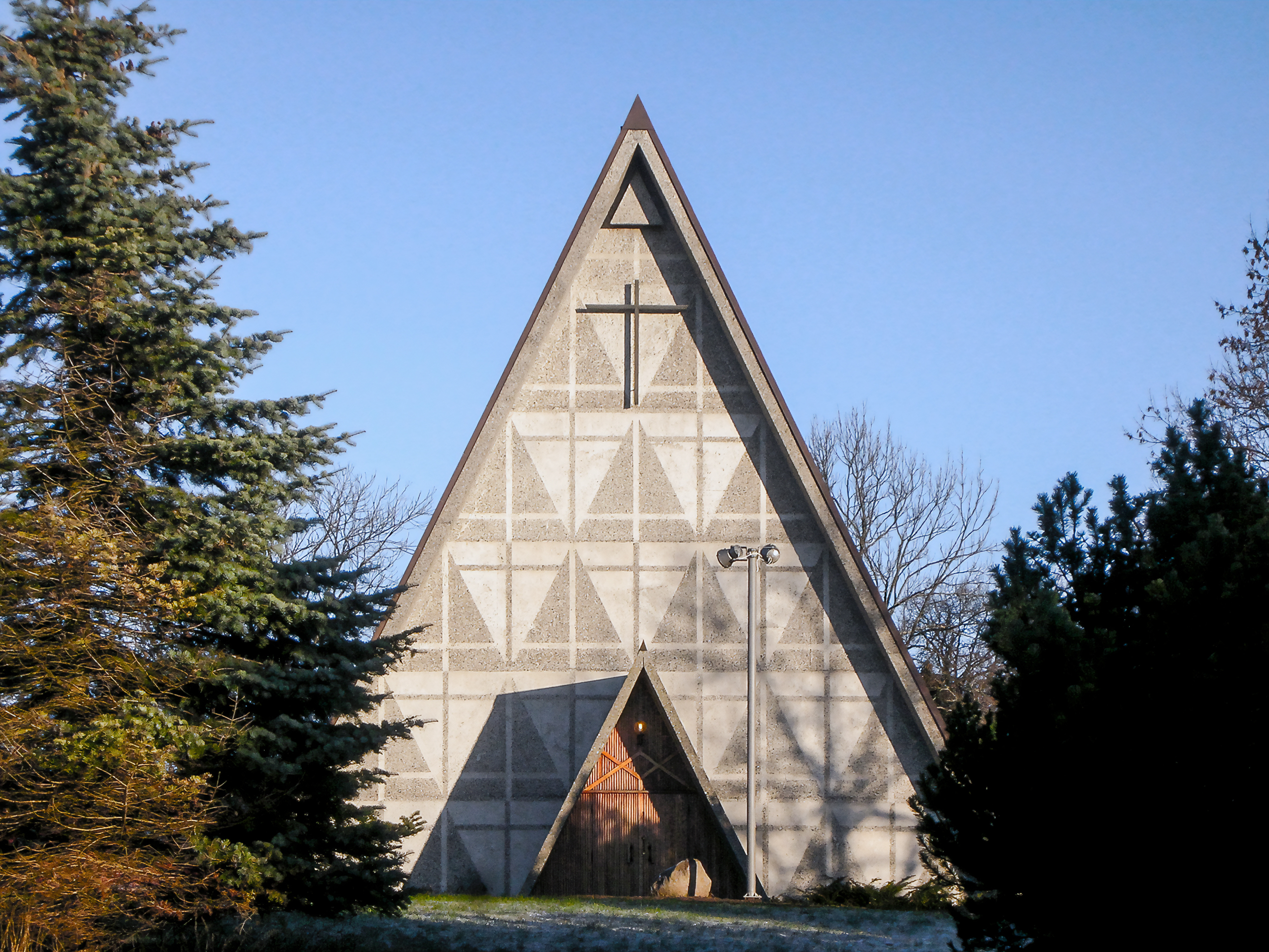
Bakkehaugens kirke, the parish church of Bakkehaugen parish, diocese of Oslo, Church of Norway.

Betograve is a type of concrete sculpting. A document published by the Nasher Sculpture Center says that betograve "...involves first pouring concrete into a form tightly packed with gravel, and, once set, precisely sand-blasting the surface of the concrete to expose the gravel beneath it". This "unique system of concrete placement" was first used by Carl Nesjar, a Norwegian painter, printmaker and sculptor. When Nesjar introduced the technique to Pablo Picasso, Picasso created a sculpture based on his folded sheet metal "Head of a Woman" ("Tête de femme"). The resulting piece "inaugurated a working relationship between Picasso and Nesjar that produced twenty-four works and lasted for the rest of Picasso's life".
