= Carl Nesjar =

Norwegian painter, sculptor and printmaker

- Born: Carl Carlsen; 6 July 1920; Larvik, Norway
- Died: 23 May 2015 (aged 94); Oslo, Norway
- Occupations: painter, sculptor and printmaker

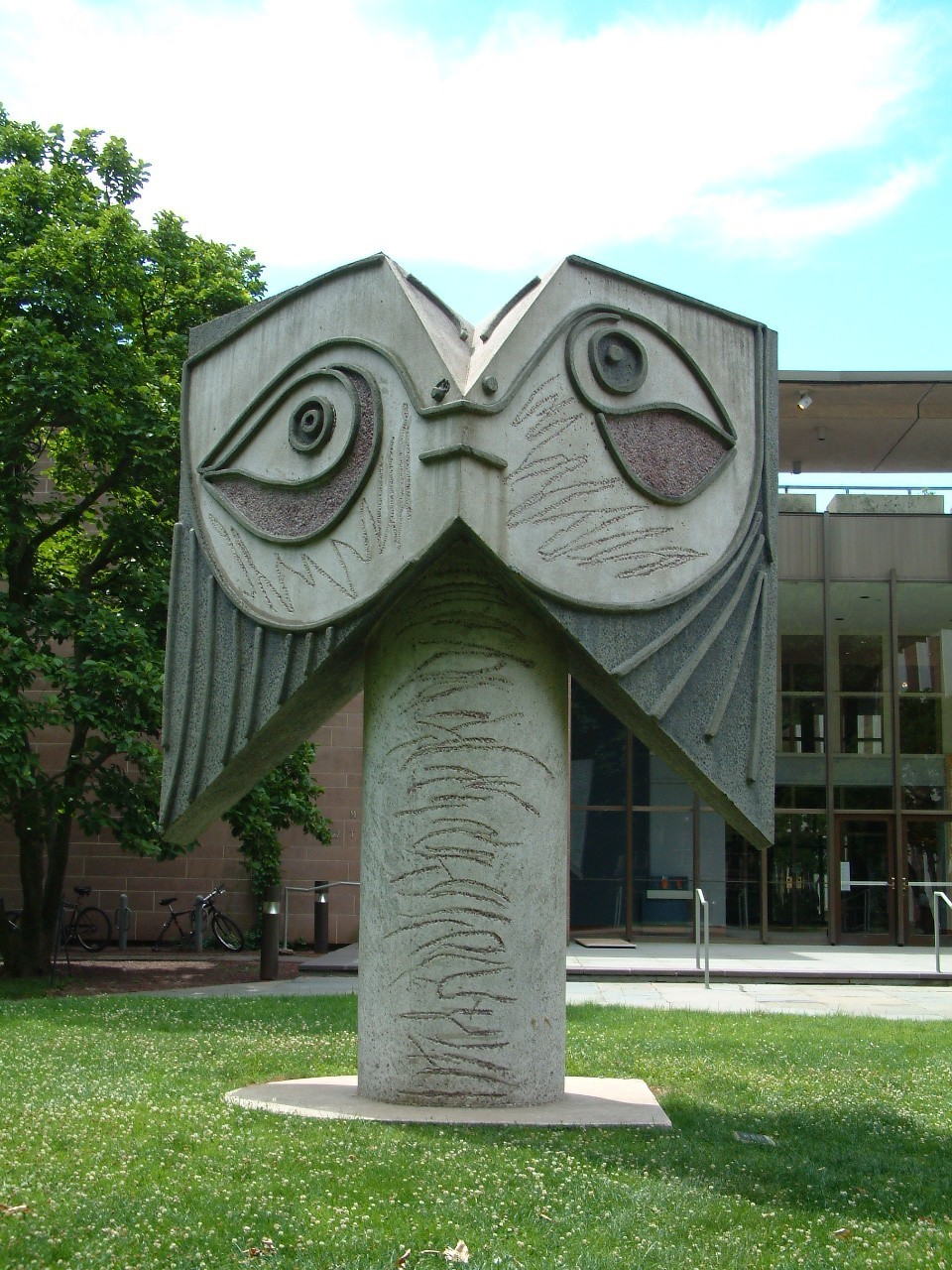
Designed by Pablo Picasso, executed by Carl Nesjar, Head of a Woman, designed 1962, executed 1971, at the Princeton University Art Museum

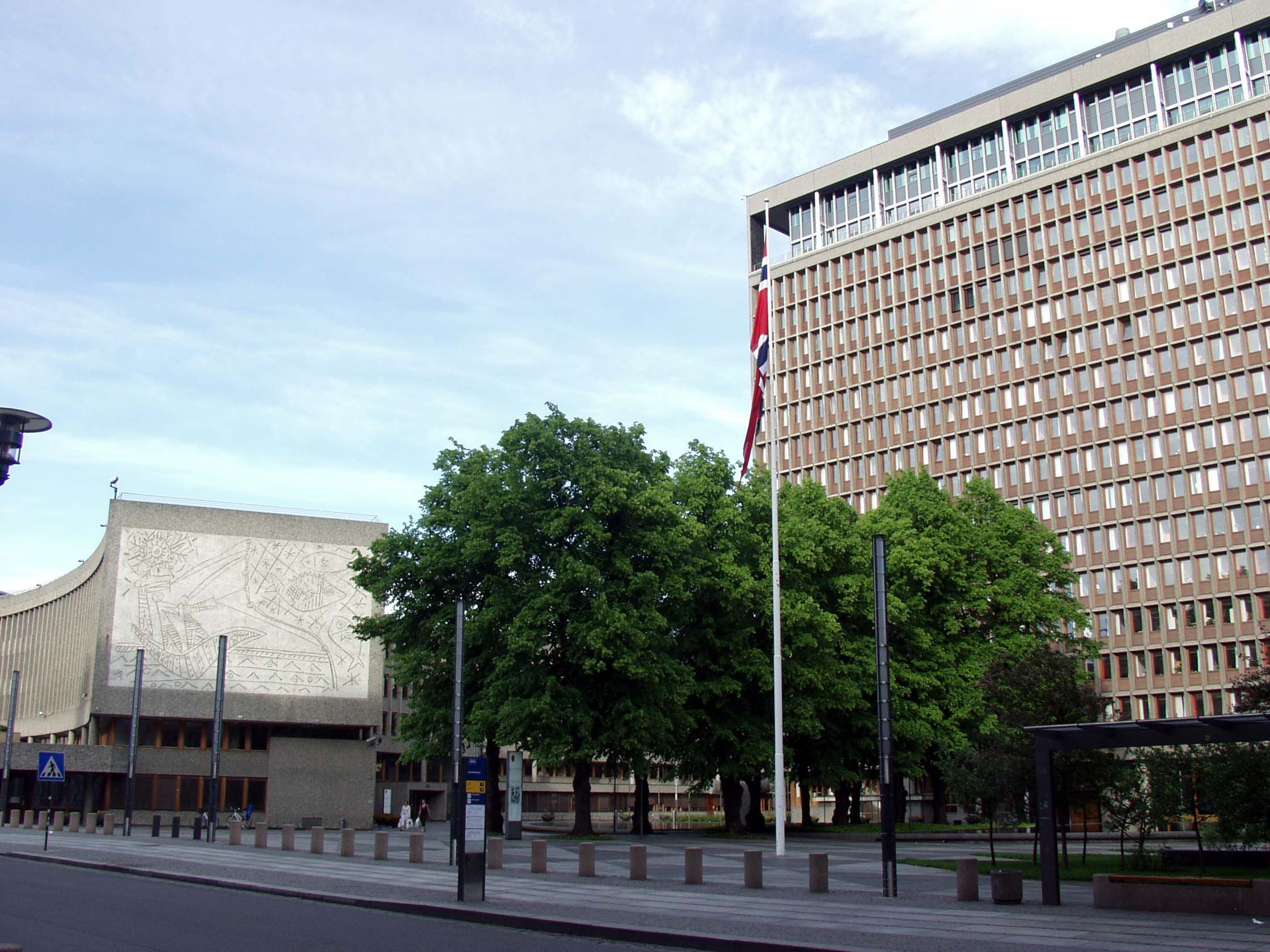
Regjeringskvartalet, Oslo (2005 photo), with mural sculptured by Nesjar after Picasso's design.

Carl Nesjar (né Carlsen; 6 July 1920 – 23 May 2015) was a Norwegian painter, sculptor and graphic artist. He is best known for his collaborations with Pablo Picasso; serving for nearly twenty years as Picasso's chosen fabricator — the artist who turned Picasso's drawings and scale models into large public sculptures. One such work was Picasso's Regjeringskvartalet murals which are located in Oslo, the city where Nesjar lived for most of his life. He is also known for his series of "Ice Fountains” which can be found in cities around the world.

== Life and career ==
Born Carl Carlsen in Larvik, Norway, Nesjar was raised in Southern Norway and in the Bay Ridge neighborhood of Brooklyn, New York, United States. He studied art at the Pratt Institute; Columbia University; and in Oslo and Paris. Towards the beginning of his career he assumed the name 'Nesjar', the Norse word for the coastal area around Larvik.

Nesjar collaborated with architect Erling Viksjø on a particular concrete sculpting method called Betograve. The introduction of this technique to Picasso led to a lasting collaboration between the two, starting with the realization of a version of the sculpture Tête de femme in gravel and concrete in 1958. Over the next 15 years Nesjar and Picasso created more than 30 sculptures together. Examples of their work can be found on the campuses of New York University, Princeton University and the Massachusetts Institute of Technology, as well as in public spaces in Norway, France, Spain and Israel among other nations.

Pablo Picasso created three concrete sculptures titled: Figure découpée. Picasso learned the art process from Nesjar. First a wooden frame was constructed and filled with dark rock materials and then covered with concrete. The surface of the concrete was then sandblasted following a template and the blasted away material revealed the dark material in the lines on the surface.

Nesjar died in Oslo on 23 May 2015 at the age of 94.

== See also ==
- Sylvette
- Picasso's Regjeringskvartalet murals
