= Picasso's Regjeringskvartalet murals =

Oslo murals designed by Pablo Picasso

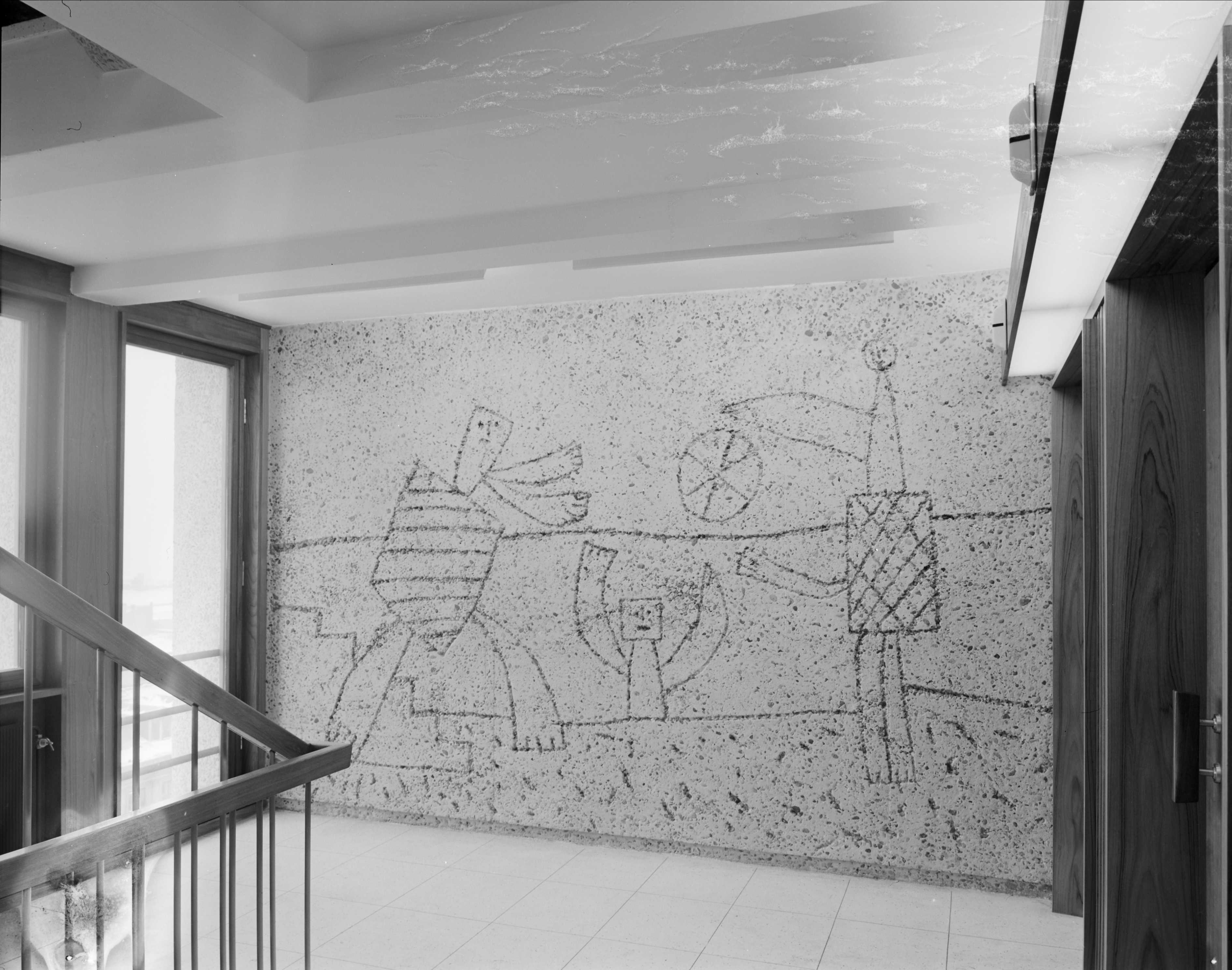
Picasso mural in the Highrise block

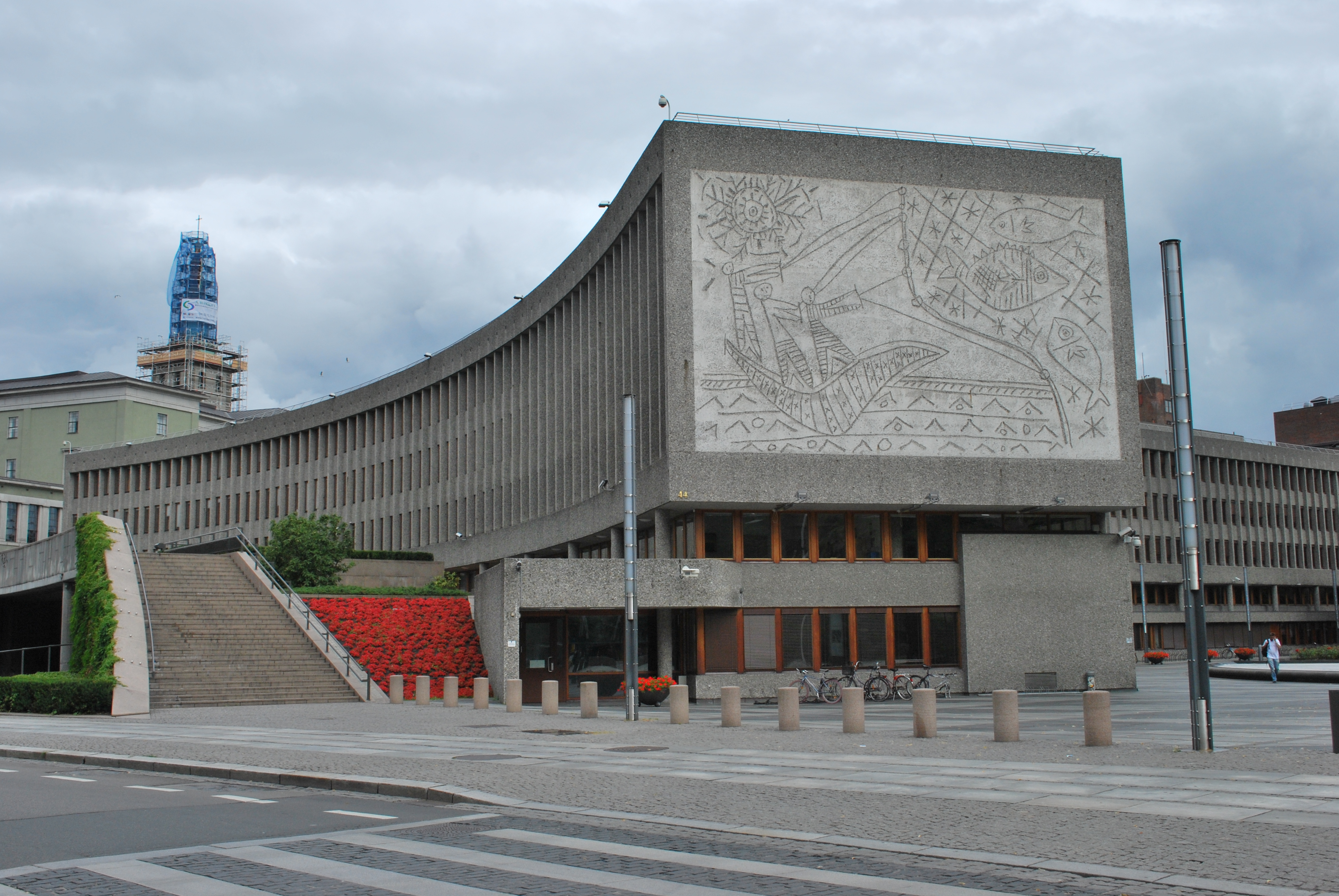
The Fishermen on the Y-Block

Picasso's Regjeringskvartalet murals are a series of murals designed by the Spanish artist Pablo Picasso in the late 1950s and the early 1970s. He designed five murals (The Beach, The Seagull, Satyr and Faun and two versions of The Fishermen) for the Regjeringskvartalet ('Government quarter') buildings in central Oslo, Norway. The designs by Picasso were executed in concrete by Norwegian artist Carl Nesjar, and were Picasso's first attempt at monumental concrete murals. The buildings onto which the murals were executed are known as the 'H-Block' or Highrise (1959) and 'Y-Block' (1968); they were designed by the Norwegian architect Erling Viksjø. The largest mural, The Fishermen (1970) is on the façade of Y-Block. Picasso would later create works in a similar vein in Barcelona and Stockholm.

== 2011 Norway attacks ==
The Regjeringskvartalet complex was badly damaged by a car bomb that exploded on 22 July 2011. The Highrise block and the Y-Block had no structural damages after the bombing. Despite this a long discourse took place, as the government wanted to demolish both buildings by architect Erling Viksjø. The H-Block was saved, but the Y-Block is under threat. The Regjeringskvartalet government complex is Norway's most iconic modernist buildings.

The Y-Block of 1969 and the H-Block of 1958 form the modernist contribution to the government quarter of Oslo. Just before the attack in 2011, both buildings were about to be granted protection by the Directorate of Cultural Heritage. Experts inside and outside of Norway agree on its immeasurable value and have tried to convince the government to stop the demolition plans. Europa Nostra included the Y-Block in its list of Europe's most endangered buildings in 2020.

The Y-Block is one of Viksjø's most beautiful buildings constructed in Naturbetong, a special concrete casting technique he developed together with engineer Sverre Jystad that was patented in 1955/-57. The possibilities that lay in this new material with sandblasted surfaces were decisive for Picasso's contribution and lead to a 17-year long collaboration with the Norwegian artist Carl Nesjar. The development of Naturbetong with its integration of art is a unique contribution to Norwegian and international modernism. Only one other building worldwide, the House of Architects in Barcelona, has this kind of integral art by Picasso and Nesjar in a public space.

The murals were subsequently listed as one of Europe's most endangered heritage sites in 2015 by the heritage organisation Europa Nostra following the Norwegian cabinet's vote to demolish the Y-Block building.

== Relocation ==
In November 2020 the murals of the Y Building were removed and put in a storage and the building was torn down.
