= Lydia Corbett =

French-English painter

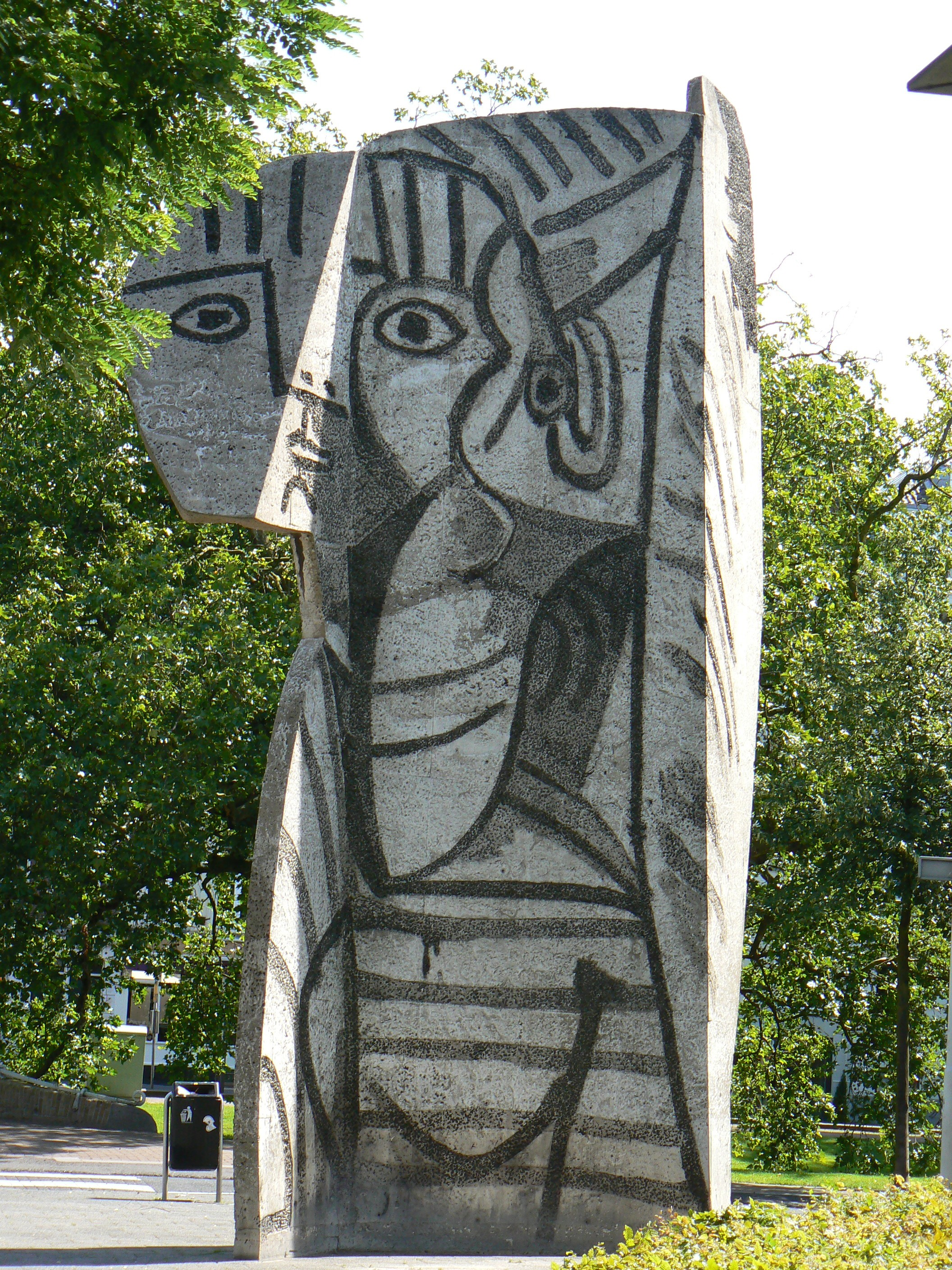
- Sylvette, a 1970 Picasso sculpture in Rotterdam representing Lydia Corbett
- Born: Sylvette David; 14 November 1934 (age 91); Paris, France

Lydia Corbett (born Sylvette David, 14 November 1934) is a French-English artist and former artist's model known for being "the girl with the ponytail" in Pablo Picasso's Sylvette series of paintings and a 1970 sculpture.

== Early life ==
Corbett was born Sylvette David in Paris to an English mother and a French father. Her mother, Honor Gell – who was an oil painter and the daughter of a vicar – moved to Normandy in the 1920s. Corbett's father was art dealer Emmanuel David. After her birth, Corbett's parents' marriage broke down, leading to her father being absent throughout much of her childhood.

In the spring of 1954, when Corbett was nineteen, she met Pablo Picasso, who was "immediately entranced" by her. Picasso had a studio on Rue du Fournas in Vallauris, and Corbett – then known as Sylvette – would often walk past the artist's window en route to meet her fiancé.

A few weeks later, Corbett was chatting with friends while smoking and drinking coffee when she spotted Picasso in his studio next door, holding up one of his pictures. The picture was a simple portrait of her, executed from memory. "It was like an invitation," she later recalled, so she and her friends went to knock on his door. Picasso was so happy to see her that he embraced her immediately. "I want to paint you, paint Sylvette!" he cried.

In the months that followed, between April and June, Picasso persuaded Corbett to sit for him regularly and created a series of more than 60 portraits of her in various media, including drawings and sculptures as well as 28 paintings.

In the summer of 1954, the "Sylvette" series was exhibited in Paris to critical acclaim. Life magazine announced a new epoch in Picasso's art – his "Ponytail Period" – and Brigitte Bardot is said to have adopted Sylvette's style after seeing her walking along the promenade in Cannes.

== Career ==
Corbett started drawing to pass the time while she sat for Picasso, often posed in a rocking chair. She later married and, in 1968, moved to England, signing her work with her married name to avoid capitalising on her fame as a painter's muse.

She began painting seriously, using both oil paint and watercolour, in her 40s, and has been represented by Francis Kyle Gallery since 1989. In 1991, her work was exhibited in Japan, and in 1993, a documentary film on Picasso and Corbett was shown on BBC2 to coincide with the Tate Gallery's exhibition of Picasso's paintings. Corbett's own work has also been exhibited at the Tate, and she counts the Anthony Petullo Foundation among her clients.

In 2014, Corbett marked her 80th birthday with an exhibition at the Francis Kyle Gallery in London.

Corbett's studio is based in Devon.

== Personal life ==
Her daughter Alice was previously married to the former England rugby captain Lawrence Dallaglio.
